

212001–212100 

|-bgcolor=#fefefe
| 212001 ||  || — || January 16, 2005 || Socorro || LINEAR || — || align=right | 1.2 km || 
|-id=002 bgcolor=#fefefe
| 212002 ||  || — || January 16, 2005 || Kitt Peak || Spacewatch || V || align=right | 1.0 km || 
|-id=003 bgcolor=#fefefe
| 212003 ||  || — || January 16, 2005 || Kitt Peak || Spacewatch || MAS || align=right | 1.1 km || 
|-id=004 bgcolor=#E9E9E9
| 212004 ||  || — || January 17, 2005 || Socorro || LINEAR || — || align=right | 3.5 km || 
|-id=005 bgcolor=#fefefe
| 212005 ||  || — || January 16, 2005 || Socorro || LINEAR || NYS || align=right data-sort-value="0.78" | 780 m || 
|-id=006 bgcolor=#fefefe
| 212006 ||  || — || January 16, 2005 || Kitt Peak || Spacewatch || — || align=right | 1.1 km || 
|-id=007 bgcolor=#fefefe
| 212007 ||  || — || January 17, 2005 || Catalina || CSS || FLO || align=right | 1.1 km || 
|-id=008 bgcolor=#fefefe
| 212008 ||  || — || January 17, 2005 || Socorro || LINEAR || V || align=right | 1.1 km || 
|-id=009 bgcolor=#fefefe
| 212009 ||  || — || January 20, 2005 || Socorro || LINEAR || PHO || align=right | 1.8 km || 
|-id=010 bgcolor=#E9E9E9
| 212010 ||  || — || January 16, 2005 || Mauna Kea || C. Veillet || — || align=right | 1.4 km || 
|-id=011 bgcolor=#fefefe
| 212011 ||  || — || February 1, 2005 || Catalina || CSS || NYS || align=right data-sort-value="0.97" | 970 m || 
|-id=012 bgcolor=#fefefe
| 212012 ||  || — || February 1, 2005 || Kitt Peak || Spacewatch || NYS || align=right | 1.1 km || 
|-id=013 bgcolor=#fefefe
| 212013 ||  || — || February 1, 2005 || Kitt Peak || Spacewatch || — || align=right | 2.6 km || 
|-id=014 bgcolor=#fefefe
| 212014 ||  || — || February 1, 2005 || Catalina || CSS || NYS || align=right | 1.4 km || 
|-id=015 bgcolor=#fefefe
| 212015 ||  || — || February 1, 2005 || Kitt Peak || Spacewatch || NYS || align=right data-sort-value="0.90" | 900 m || 
|-id=016 bgcolor=#fefefe
| 212016 ||  || — || February 1, 2005 || Kitt Peak || Spacewatch || — || align=right | 1.1 km || 
|-id=017 bgcolor=#fefefe
| 212017 ||  || — || February 1, 2005 || Kitt Peak || Spacewatch || — || align=right data-sort-value="0.98" | 980 m || 
|-id=018 bgcolor=#fefefe
| 212018 ||  || — || February 2, 2005 || Kitt Peak || Spacewatch || V || align=right data-sort-value="0.92" | 920 m || 
|-id=019 bgcolor=#fefefe
| 212019 ||  || — || February 2, 2005 || Kitt Peak || Spacewatch || NYS || align=right data-sort-value="0.90" | 900 m || 
|-id=020 bgcolor=#fefefe
| 212020 ||  || — || February 2, 2005 || Kitt Peak || Spacewatch || KLI || align=right | 2.9 km || 
|-id=021 bgcolor=#fefefe
| 212021 ||  || — || February 2, 2005 || Socorro || LINEAR || — || align=right | 1.2 km || 
|-id=022 bgcolor=#fefefe
| 212022 ||  || — || February 2, 2005 || Socorro || LINEAR || MAS || align=right data-sort-value="0.85" | 850 m || 
|-id=023 bgcolor=#fefefe
| 212023 ||  || — || February 2, 2005 || Catalina || CSS || NYS || align=right data-sort-value="0.83" | 830 m || 
|-id=024 bgcolor=#fefefe
| 212024 ||  || — || February 2, 2005 || Catalina || CSS || NYS || align=right | 1.2 km || 
|-id=025 bgcolor=#fefefe
| 212025 ||  || — || February 3, 2005 || Socorro || LINEAR || NYS || align=right data-sort-value="0.82" | 820 m || 
|-id=026 bgcolor=#fefefe
| 212026 ||  || — || February 1, 2005 || Catalina || CSS || — || align=right | 1.3 km || 
|-id=027 bgcolor=#fefefe
| 212027 ||  || — || February 4, 2005 || Catalina || CSS || — || align=right | 1.6 km || 
|-id=028 bgcolor=#E9E9E9
| 212028 ||  || — || February 1, 2005 || Kitt Peak || Spacewatch || — || align=right | 1.2 km || 
|-id=029 bgcolor=#fefefe
| 212029 ||  || — || February 3, 2005 || Goodricke-Pigott || R. A. Tucker || — || align=right | 1.1 km || 
|-id=030 bgcolor=#fefefe
| 212030 ||  || — || February 1, 2005 || Kitt Peak || Spacewatch || NYS || align=right data-sort-value="0.84" | 840 m || 
|-id=031 bgcolor=#fefefe
| 212031 ||  || — || February 3, 2005 || Socorro || LINEAR || — || align=right | 2.8 km || 
|-id=032 bgcolor=#fefefe
| 212032 ||  || — || February 3, 2005 || Socorro || LINEAR || NYS || align=right data-sort-value="0.97" | 970 m || 
|-id=033 bgcolor=#fefefe
| 212033 ||  || — || February 1, 2005 || Catalina || CSS || — || align=right | 1.0 km || 
|-id=034 bgcolor=#E9E9E9
| 212034 ||  || — || February 7, 2005 || Altschwendt || Altschwendt Obs. || — || align=right | 1.3 km || 
|-id=035 bgcolor=#fefefe
| 212035 ||  || — || February 2, 2005 || Kitt Peak || Spacewatch || NYS || align=right data-sort-value="0.91" | 910 m || 
|-id=036 bgcolor=#fefefe
| 212036 ||  || — || February 2, 2005 || Socorro || LINEAR || — || align=right | 1.3 km || 
|-id=037 bgcolor=#fefefe
| 212037 ||  || — || February 2, 2005 || Catalina || CSS || NYS || align=right data-sort-value="0.99" | 990 m || 
|-id=038 bgcolor=#fefefe
| 212038 ||  || — || February 3, 2005 || Socorro || LINEAR || NYS || align=right | 1.3 km || 
|-id=039 bgcolor=#fefefe
| 212039 ||  || — || February 3, 2005 || Socorro || LINEAR || NYS || align=right | 1.0 km || 
|-id=040 bgcolor=#fefefe
| 212040 ||  || — || February 3, 2005 || Socorro || LINEAR || NYS || align=right | 1.2 km || 
|-id=041 bgcolor=#fefefe
| 212041 ||  || — || February 2, 2005 || Socorro || LINEAR || NYS || align=right | 1.0 km || 
|-id=042 bgcolor=#fefefe
| 212042 ||  || — || February 2, 2005 || Catalina || CSS || V || align=right | 1.1 km || 
|-id=043 bgcolor=#fefefe
| 212043 ||  || — || February 9, 2005 || Anderson Mesa || LONEOS || V || align=right data-sort-value="0.98" | 980 m || 
|-id=044 bgcolor=#fefefe
| 212044 ||  || — || February 9, 2005 || Mount Lemmon || Mount Lemmon Survey || — || align=right | 1.2 km || 
|-id=045 bgcolor=#fefefe
| 212045 ||  || — || February 9, 2005 || Kitt Peak || Spacewatch || NYS || align=right data-sort-value="0.95" | 950 m || 
|-id=046 bgcolor=#fefefe
| 212046 ||  || — || February 1, 2005 || Palomar || NEAT || — || align=right | 1.3 km || 
|-id=047 bgcolor=#fefefe
| 212047 ||  || — || February 2, 2005 || Socorro || LINEAR || — || align=right | 1.5 km || 
|-id=048 bgcolor=#fefefe
| 212048 ||  || — || February 2, 2005 || Kitt Peak || Spacewatch || MAS || align=right | 1.1 km || 
|-id=049 bgcolor=#fefefe
| 212049 ||  || — || February 1, 2005 || Palomar || NEAT || — || align=right | 1.2 km || 
|-id=050 bgcolor=#fefefe
| 212050 ||  || — || March 1, 2005 || Kitt Peak || Spacewatch || — || align=right | 1.2 km || 
|-id=051 bgcolor=#fefefe
| 212051 ||  || — || March 2, 2005 || Catalina || CSS || — || align=right | 1.1 km || 
|-id=052 bgcolor=#fefefe
| 212052 ||  || — || March 3, 2005 || Catalina || CSS || — || align=right | 1.4 km || 
|-id=053 bgcolor=#fefefe
| 212053 ||  || — || March 3, 2005 || Catalina || CSS || V || align=right | 1.3 km || 
|-id=054 bgcolor=#E9E9E9
| 212054 ||  || — || March 3, 2005 || Catalina || CSS || — || align=right | 2.0 km || 
|-id=055 bgcolor=#E9E9E9
| 212055 ||  || — || March 3, 2005 || Catalina || CSS || — || align=right | 1.3 km || 
|-id=056 bgcolor=#fefefe
| 212056 ||  || — || March 3, 2005 || Catalina || CSS || MAS || align=right data-sort-value="0.93" | 930 m || 
|-id=057 bgcolor=#fefefe
| 212057 ||  || — || March 3, 2005 || Catalina || CSS || NYS || align=right | 1.2 km || 
|-id=058 bgcolor=#fefefe
| 212058 ||  || — || March 4, 2005 || RAS || A. Lowe || — || align=right | 1.2 km || 
|-id=059 bgcolor=#E9E9E9
| 212059 ||  || — || March 3, 2005 || Kitt Peak || Spacewatch || — || align=right | 1.7 km || 
|-id=060 bgcolor=#fefefe
| 212060 ||  || — || March 3, 2005 || Catalina || CSS || NYS || align=right data-sort-value="0.86" | 860 m || 
|-id=061 bgcolor=#E9E9E9
| 212061 ||  || — || March 3, 2005 || Catalina || CSS || — || align=right | 1.9 km || 
|-id=062 bgcolor=#fefefe
| 212062 ||  || — || March 3, 2005 || Catalina || CSS || EUT || align=right data-sort-value="0.91" | 910 m || 
|-id=063 bgcolor=#fefefe
| 212063 ||  || — || March 4, 2005 || Catalina || CSS || — || align=right | 1.4 km || 
|-id=064 bgcolor=#FA8072
| 212064 ||  || — || March 4, 2005 || Catalina || CSS || — || align=right | 1.3 km || 
|-id=065 bgcolor=#fefefe
| 212065 ||  || — || March 4, 2005 || Socorro || LINEAR || — || align=right | 1.4 km || 
|-id=066 bgcolor=#fefefe
| 212066 ||  || — || March 1, 2005 || Kitt Peak || Spacewatch || V || align=right | 1.1 km || 
|-id=067 bgcolor=#fefefe
| 212067 ||  || — || March 1, 2005 || Kitt Peak || Spacewatch || NYS || align=right | 1.2 km || 
|-id=068 bgcolor=#E9E9E9
| 212068 ||  || — || March 3, 2005 || Catalina || CSS || — || align=right | 1.7 km || 
|-id=069 bgcolor=#fefefe
| 212069 ||  || — || March 3, 2005 || Catalina || CSS || — || align=right | 1.2 km || 
|-id=070 bgcolor=#E9E9E9
| 212070 ||  || — || March 4, 2005 || Kitt Peak || Spacewatch || — || align=right | 1.2 km || 
|-id=071 bgcolor=#fefefe
| 212071 ||  || — || March 4, 2005 || Kitt Peak || Spacewatch || MAS || align=right data-sort-value="0.82" | 820 m || 
|-id=072 bgcolor=#fefefe
| 212072 ||  || — || March 4, 2005 || Kitt Peak || Spacewatch || — || align=right | 1.5 km || 
|-id=073 bgcolor=#E9E9E9
| 212073 Carlzimmer ||  ||  || March 4, 2005 || Mount Lemmon || Mount Lemmon Survey || — || align=right | 1.2 km || 
|-id=074 bgcolor=#E9E9E9
| 212074 ||  || — || March 4, 2005 || Mount Lemmon || Mount Lemmon Survey || — || align=right | 2.3 km || 
|-id=075 bgcolor=#fefefe
| 212075 ||  || — || March 2, 2005 || Catalina || CSS || — || align=right | 2.9 km || 
|-id=076 bgcolor=#E9E9E9
| 212076 ||  || — || March 3, 2005 || Kitt Peak || Spacewatch || — || align=right | 1.1 km || 
|-id=077 bgcolor=#fefefe
| 212077 ||  || — || March 3, 2005 || Kitt Peak || Spacewatch || NYS || align=right data-sort-value="0.83" | 830 m || 
|-id=078 bgcolor=#E9E9E9
| 212078 ||  || — || March 3, 2005 || Catalina || CSS || EUN || align=right | 1.9 km || 
|-id=079 bgcolor=#E9E9E9
| 212079 ||  || — || March 4, 2005 || Kitt Peak || Spacewatch || — || align=right data-sort-value="0.99" | 990 m || 
|-id=080 bgcolor=#fefefe
| 212080 ||  || — || March 4, 2005 || Socorro || LINEAR || CHL || align=right | 3.2 km || 
|-id=081 bgcolor=#fefefe
| 212081 ||  || — || March 3, 2005 || Catalina || CSS || — || align=right | 1.6 km || 
|-id=082 bgcolor=#E9E9E9
| 212082 ||  || — || March 3, 2005 || Catalina || CSS || — || align=right | 2.1 km || 
|-id=083 bgcolor=#E9E9E9
| 212083 ||  || — || March 3, 2005 || Kitt Peak || Spacewatch || — || align=right | 3.1 km || 
|-id=084 bgcolor=#fefefe
| 212084 ||  || — || March 4, 2005 || Mount Lemmon || Mount Lemmon Survey || V || align=right data-sort-value="0.92" | 920 m || 
|-id=085 bgcolor=#fefefe
| 212085 ||  || — || March 4, 2005 || Kitt Peak || Spacewatch || — || align=right | 1.1 km || 
|-id=086 bgcolor=#E9E9E9
| 212086 ||  || — || March 4, 2005 || Mount Lemmon || Mount Lemmon Survey || HEN || align=right | 1.1 km || 
|-id=087 bgcolor=#E9E9E9
| 212087 ||  || — || March 7, 2005 || Socorro || LINEAR || HNS || align=right | 1.7 km || 
|-id=088 bgcolor=#fefefe
| 212088 ||  || — || March 8, 2005 || Socorro || LINEAR || — || align=right | 2.8 km || 
|-id=089 bgcolor=#E9E9E9
| 212089 ||  || — || March 8, 2005 || Anderson Mesa || LONEOS || — || align=right | 1.2 km || 
|-id=090 bgcolor=#fefefe
| 212090 ||  || — || March 8, 2005 || Anderson Mesa || LONEOS || V || align=right | 1.1 km || 
|-id=091 bgcolor=#E9E9E9
| 212091 ||  || — || March 8, 2005 || Mount Lemmon || Mount Lemmon Survey || — || align=right | 1.3 km || 
|-id=092 bgcolor=#fefefe
| 212092 ||  || — || March 8, 2005 || Mount Lemmon || Mount Lemmon Survey || — || align=right | 1.00 km || 
|-id=093 bgcolor=#fefefe
| 212093 ||  || — || March 9, 2005 || Mount Lemmon || Mount Lemmon Survey || — || align=right | 1.4 km || 
|-id=094 bgcolor=#E9E9E9
| 212094 ||  || — || March 9, 2005 || Socorro || LINEAR || — || align=right | 1.4 km || 
|-id=095 bgcolor=#E9E9E9
| 212095 ||  || — || March 9, 2005 || Mount Lemmon || Mount Lemmon Survey || — || align=right | 1.4 km || 
|-id=096 bgcolor=#fefefe
| 212096 ||  || — || March 9, 2005 || Socorro || LINEAR || — || align=right | 2.8 km || 
|-id=097 bgcolor=#E9E9E9
| 212097 ||  || — || March 9, 2005 || Mount Lemmon || Mount Lemmon Survey || AGN || align=right | 1.4 km || 
|-id=098 bgcolor=#E9E9E9
| 212098 ||  || — || March 9, 2005 || Mount Lemmon || Mount Lemmon Survey || — || align=right | 2.9 km || 
|-id=099 bgcolor=#E9E9E9
| 212099 ||  || — || March 9, 2005 || Kitt Peak || Spacewatch || — || align=right | 2.4 km || 
|-id=100 bgcolor=#E9E9E9
| 212100 ||  || — || March 10, 2005 || Kitt Peak || Spacewatch || — || align=right | 1.7 km || 
|}

212101–212200 

|-bgcolor=#E9E9E9
| 212101 ||  || — || March 9, 2005 || Catalina || CSS || HNS || align=right | 1.7 km || 
|-id=102 bgcolor=#E9E9E9
| 212102 ||  || — || March 8, 2005 || Mount Lemmon || Mount Lemmon Survey || MIT || align=right | 3.5 km || 
|-id=103 bgcolor=#E9E9E9
| 212103 ||  || — || March 8, 2005 || Mount Lemmon || Mount Lemmon Survey || MAR || align=right | 1.7 km || 
|-id=104 bgcolor=#fefefe
| 212104 ||  || — || March 9, 2005 || Catalina || CSS || — || align=right | 3.0 km || 
|-id=105 bgcolor=#E9E9E9
| 212105 ||  || — || March 9, 2005 || Mount Lemmon || Mount Lemmon Survey || — || align=right | 1.3 km || 
|-id=106 bgcolor=#E9E9E9
| 212106 ||  || — || March 9, 2005 || Mount Lemmon || Mount Lemmon Survey || — || align=right data-sort-value="0.94" | 940 m || 
|-id=107 bgcolor=#E9E9E9
| 212107 ||  || — || March 9, 2005 || Mount Lemmon || Mount Lemmon Survey || — || align=right | 2.4 km || 
|-id=108 bgcolor=#E9E9E9
| 212108 ||  || — || March 12, 2005 || Socorro || LINEAR || — || align=right | 3.3 km || 
|-id=109 bgcolor=#E9E9E9
| 212109 ||  || — || March 7, 2005 || Socorro || LINEAR || GER || align=right | 4.0 km || 
|-id=110 bgcolor=#E9E9E9
| 212110 ||  || — || March 8, 2005 || Anderson Mesa || LONEOS || — || align=right | 2.0 km || 
|-id=111 bgcolor=#E9E9E9
| 212111 ||  || — || March 8, 2005 || Kitt Peak || Spacewatch || — || align=right | 1.4 km || 
|-id=112 bgcolor=#E9E9E9
| 212112 ||  || — || March 8, 2005 || Socorro || LINEAR || — || align=right | 1.6 km || 
|-id=113 bgcolor=#E9E9E9
| 212113 ||  || — || March 8, 2005 || Mount Lemmon || Mount Lemmon Survey || — || align=right | 2.8 km || 
|-id=114 bgcolor=#E9E9E9
| 212114 ||  || — || March 9, 2005 || Kitt Peak || Spacewatch || — || align=right | 1.3 km || 
|-id=115 bgcolor=#E9E9E9
| 212115 ||  || — || March 9, 2005 || Kitt Peak || Spacewatch || — || align=right | 3.4 km || 
|-id=116 bgcolor=#E9E9E9
| 212116 ||  || — || March 9, 2005 || Kitt Peak || Spacewatch || — || align=right | 2.1 km || 
|-id=117 bgcolor=#E9E9E9
| 212117 ||  || — || March 11, 2005 || Kitt Peak || Spacewatch || — || align=right | 1.9 km || 
|-id=118 bgcolor=#fefefe
| 212118 ||  || — || March 11, 2005 || Mount Lemmon || Mount Lemmon Survey || NYS || align=right | 1.9 km || 
|-id=119 bgcolor=#fefefe
| 212119 ||  || — || March 11, 2005 || Mount Lemmon || Mount Lemmon Survey || — || align=right | 1.3 km || 
|-id=120 bgcolor=#E9E9E9
| 212120 ||  || — || March 11, 2005 || Mount Lemmon || Mount Lemmon Survey || — || align=right | 1.5 km || 
|-id=121 bgcolor=#fefefe
| 212121 ||  || — || March 11, 2005 || Mount Lemmon || Mount Lemmon Survey || MAS || align=right data-sort-value="0.84" | 840 m || 
|-id=122 bgcolor=#E9E9E9
| 212122 ||  || — || March 11, 2005 || Socorro || LINEAR || — || align=right | 2.9 km || 
|-id=123 bgcolor=#E9E9E9
| 212123 ||  || — || March 11, 2005 || Mount Lemmon || Mount Lemmon Survey || — || align=right | 1.1 km || 
|-id=124 bgcolor=#E9E9E9
| 212124 ||  || — || March 4, 2005 || Kitt Peak || Spacewatch || — || align=right | 1.2 km || 
|-id=125 bgcolor=#E9E9E9
| 212125 ||  || — || March 4, 2005 || Catalina || CSS || — || align=right | 2.1 km || 
|-id=126 bgcolor=#fefefe
| 212126 ||  || — || March 9, 2005 || Anderson Mesa || LONEOS || — || align=right | 1.1 km || 
|-id=127 bgcolor=#E9E9E9
| 212127 ||  || — || March 9, 2005 || Mount Lemmon || Mount Lemmon Survey || — || align=right | 1.8 km || 
|-id=128 bgcolor=#fefefe
| 212128 ||  || — || March 10, 2005 || Catalina || CSS || — || align=right | 1.3 km || 
|-id=129 bgcolor=#fefefe
| 212129 ||  || — || March 10, 2005 || Mount Lemmon || Mount Lemmon Survey || NYS || align=right | 1.1 km || 
|-id=130 bgcolor=#E9E9E9
| 212130 ||  || — || March 8, 2005 || Socorro || LINEAR || — || align=right | 1.7 km || 
|-id=131 bgcolor=#fefefe
| 212131 ||  || — || March 9, 2005 || Catalina || CSS || — || align=right | 1.3 km || 
|-id=132 bgcolor=#fefefe
| 212132 ||  || — || March 10, 2005 || Mount Lemmon || Mount Lemmon Survey || — || align=right | 1.3 km || 
|-id=133 bgcolor=#E9E9E9
| 212133 ||  || — || March 10, 2005 || Catalina || CSS || ADE || align=right | 3.5 km || 
|-id=134 bgcolor=#E9E9E9
| 212134 ||  || — || March 11, 2005 || Kitt Peak || Spacewatch || — || align=right data-sort-value="0.93" | 930 m || 
|-id=135 bgcolor=#fefefe
| 212135 ||  || — || March 11, 2005 || Catalina || CSS || — || align=right | 1.2 km || 
|-id=136 bgcolor=#fefefe
| 212136 ||  || — || March 11, 2005 || Catalina || CSS || V || align=right | 1.2 km || 
|-id=137 bgcolor=#fefefe
| 212137 ||  || — || March 10, 2005 || Catalina || CSS || — || align=right data-sort-value="0.92" | 920 m || 
|-id=138 bgcolor=#fefefe
| 212138 ||  || — || March 10, 2005 || Anderson Mesa || LONEOS || V || align=right | 1.1 km || 
|-id=139 bgcolor=#E9E9E9
| 212139 ||  || — || March 10, 2005 || Catalina || CSS || — || align=right | 4.0 km || 
|-id=140 bgcolor=#E9E9E9
| 212140 ||  || — || March 11, 2005 || Kitt Peak || Spacewatch || — || align=right | 2.4 km || 
|-id=141 bgcolor=#E9E9E9
| 212141 ||  || — || March 8, 2005 || Mount Lemmon || Mount Lemmon Survey || — || align=right | 1.0 km || 
|-id=142 bgcolor=#fefefe
| 212142 ||  || — || March 9, 2005 || Catalina || CSS || — || align=right | 3.0 km || 
|-id=143 bgcolor=#E9E9E9
| 212143 ||  || — || March 9, 2005 || Mount Lemmon || Mount Lemmon Survey || — || align=right | 1.7 km || 
|-id=144 bgcolor=#E9E9E9
| 212144 ||  || — || March 9, 2005 || Mount Lemmon || Mount Lemmon Survey || — || align=right | 1.2 km || 
|-id=145 bgcolor=#E9E9E9
| 212145 ||  || — || March 10, 2005 || Catalina || CSS || — || align=right | 1.9 km || 
|-id=146 bgcolor=#fefefe
| 212146 ||  || — || March 10, 2005 || Anderson Mesa || LONEOS || — || align=right | 2.9 km || 
|-id=147 bgcolor=#d6d6d6
| 212147 ||  || — || March 10, 2005 || Anderson Mesa || LONEOS || — || align=right | 4.7 km || 
|-id=148 bgcolor=#E9E9E9
| 212148 ||  || — || March 8, 2005 || Mount Lemmon || Mount Lemmon Survey || — || align=right | 1.2 km || 
|-id=149 bgcolor=#E9E9E9
| 212149 ||  || — || March 10, 2005 || Catalina || CSS || — || align=right | 2.4 km || 
|-id=150 bgcolor=#fefefe
| 212150 ||  || — || March 10, 2005 || Mount Lemmon || Mount Lemmon Survey || — || align=right | 1.2 km || 
|-id=151 bgcolor=#fefefe
| 212151 ||  || — || March 10, 2005 || Kitt Peak || M. W. Buie || V || align=right data-sort-value="0.87" | 870 m || 
|-id=152 bgcolor=#E9E9E9
| 212152 ||  || — || March 10, 2005 || Kitt Peak || M. W. Buie || — || align=right | 1.9 km || 
|-id=153 bgcolor=#E9E9E9
| 212153 ||  || — || March 12, 2005 || Kitt Peak || M. W. Buie || — || align=right | 1.4 km || 
|-id=154 bgcolor=#E9E9E9
| 212154 ||  || — || March 8, 2005 || Mount Lemmon || Mount Lemmon Survey || — || align=right | 1.6 km || 
|-id=155 bgcolor=#fefefe
| 212155 ||  || — || March 16, 2005 || Catalina || CSS || — || align=right | 2.3 km || 
|-id=156 bgcolor=#E9E9E9
| 212156 ||  || — || March 30, 2005 || Catalina || CSS || AER || align=right | 2.1 km || 
|-id=157 bgcolor=#E9E9E9
| 212157 ||  || — || April 1, 2005 || Kitt Peak || Spacewatch || — || align=right | 1.3 km || 
|-id=158 bgcolor=#E9E9E9
| 212158 ||  || — || April 1, 2005 || Kitt Peak || Spacewatch || — || align=right | 1.5 km || 
|-id=159 bgcolor=#E9E9E9
| 212159 ||  || — || April 1, 2005 || Kitt Peak || Spacewatch || — || align=right | 1.6 km || 
|-id=160 bgcolor=#E9E9E9
| 212160 ||  || — || April 1, 2005 || Anderson Mesa || LONEOS || — || align=right | 1.6 km || 
|-id=161 bgcolor=#E9E9E9
| 212161 ||  || — || April 1, 2005 || Anderson Mesa || LONEOS || — || align=right | 5.3 km || 
|-id=162 bgcolor=#E9E9E9
| 212162 ||  || — || April 1, 2005 || Anderson Mesa || LONEOS || — || align=right | 3.4 km || 
|-id=163 bgcolor=#E9E9E9
| 212163 ||  || — || April 1, 2005 || Anderson Mesa || LONEOS || — || align=right | 2.2 km || 
|-id=164 bgcolor=#E9E9E9
| 212164 ||  || — || April 1, 2005 || Anderson Mesa || LONEOS || EUN || align=right | 1.8 km || 
|-id=165 bgcolor=#E9E9E9
| 212165 ||  || — || April 3, 2005 || Palomar || NEAT || — || align=right | 1.3 km || 
|-id=166 bgcolor=#E9E9E9
| 212166 ||  || — || April 3, 2005 || Palomar || NEAT || ADE || align=right | 2.7 km || 
|-id=167 bgcolor=#fefefe
| 212167 ||  || — || April 5, 2005 || Mount Lemmon || Mount Lemmon Survey || — || align=right data-sort-value="0.97" | 970 m || 
|-id=168 bgcolor=#E9E9E9
| 212168 ||  || — || April 5, 2005 || Mount Lemmon || Mount Lemmon Survey || NEM || align=right | 2.7 km || 
|-id=169 bgcolor=#E9E9E9
| 212169 ||  || — || April 5, 2005 || Kitt Peak || Spacewatch || — || align=right | 2.8 km || 
|-id=170 bgcolor=#E9E9E9
| 212170 ||  || — || April 7, 2005 || RAS || A. Lowe || — || align=right | 2.9 km || 
|-id=171 bgcolor=#E9E9E9
| 212171 ||  || — || April 1, 2005 || Kitt Peak || Spacewatch || — || align=right | 2.5 km || 
|-id=172 bgcolor=#E9E9E9
| 212172 ||  || — || April 2, 2005 || Mount Lemmon || Mount Lemmon Survey || — || align=right | 3.8 km || 
|-id=173 bgcolor=#E9E9E9
| 212173 ||  || — || April 4, 2005 || Socorro || LINEAR || ADE || align=right | 2.9 km || 
|-id=174 bgcolor=#E9E9E9
| 212174 ||  || — || April 5, 2005 || Anderson Mesa || LONEOS || — || align=right | 1.8 km || 
|-id=175 bgcolor=#E9E9E9
| 212175 ||  || — || April 4, 2005 || Catalina || CSS || BAR || align=right | 2.1 km || 
|-id=176 bgcolor=#E9E9E9
| 212176 Fabriziospaziani ||  ||  || April 8, 2005 || Campo Catino || F. Mallia, M. Di Sora || — || align=right | 2.5 km || 
|-id=177 bgcolor=#E9E9E9
| 212177 ||  || — || April 5, 2005 || Palomar || NEAT || BRU || align=right | 5.1 km || 
|-id=178 bgcolor=#E9E9E9
| 212178 ||  || — || April 5, 2005 || Catalina || CSS || — || align=right | 3.3 km || 
|-id=179 bgcolor=#E9E9E9
| 212179 ||  || — || April 5, 2005 || Catalina || CSS || — || align=right | 2.4 km || 
|-id=180 bgcolor=#E9E9E9
| 212180 ||  || — || April 5, 2005 || Catalina || CSS || — || align=right | 2.4 km || 
|-id=181 bgcolor=#E9E9E9
| 212181 ||  || — || April 6, 2005 || Catalina || CSS || — || align=right | 3.1 km || 
|-id=182 bgcolor=#E9E9E9
| 212182 ||  || — || April 6, 2005 || Mount Lemmon || Mount Lemmon Survey || — || align=right | 2.8 km || 
|-id=183 bgcolor=#E9E9E9
| 212183 ||  || — || April 7, 2005 || Kitt Peak || Spacewatch || — || align=right | 2.7 km || 
|-id=184 bgcolor=#E9E9E9
| 212184 ||  || — || April 4, 2005 || Kitt Peak || Spacewatch || — || align=right | 1.4 km || 
|-id=185 bgcolor=#E9E9E9
| 212185 ||  || — || April 4, 2005 || Socorro || LINEAR || GER || align=right | 2.4 km || 
|-id=186 bgcolor=#E9E9E9
| 212186 ||  || — || April 6, 2005 || Kitt Peak || Spacewatch || RAF || align=right | 2.2 km || 
|-id=187 bgcolor=#E9E9E9
| 212187 ||  || — || April 6, 2005 || Kitt Peak || Spacewatch || — || align=right | 1.7 km || 
|-id=188 bgcolor=#FA8072
| 212188 ||  || — || April 6, 2005 || Kitt Peak || Spacewatch || — || align=right | 1.5 km || 
|-id=189 bgcolor=#d6d6d6
| 212189 ||  || — || April 7, 2005 || Mount Lemmon || Mount Lemmon Survey || — || align=right | 3.4 km || 
|-id=190 bgcolor=#E9E9E9
| 212190 ||  || — || April 9, 2005 || Kitt Peak || Spacewatch || HEN || align=right | 1.4 km || 
|-id=191 bgcolor=#E9E9E9
| 212191 ||  || — || April 9, 2005 || Kitt Peak || Spacewatch || AST || align=right | 3.3 km || 
|-id=192 bgcolor=#E9E9E9
| 212192 ||  || — || April 9, 2005 || Kitt Peak || Spacewatch || — || align=right | 2.7 km || 
|-id=193 bgcolor=#E9E9E9
| 212193 ||  || — || April 9, 2005 || Socorro || LINEAR || MIT || align=right | 3.1 km || 
|-id=194 bgcolor=#E9E9E9
| 212194 ||  || — || April 10, 2005 || Kitt Peak || Spacewatch || — || align=right | 2.2 km || 
|-id=195 bgcolor=#E9E9E9
| 212195 ||  || — || April 10, 2005 || Kitt Peak || Spacewatch || — || align=right | 2.3 km || 
|-id=196 bgcolor=#E9E9E9
| 212196 ||  || — || April 11, 2005 || Mount Lemmon || Mount Lemmon Survey || PAD || align=right | 2.3 km || 
|-id=197 bgcolor=#E9E9E9
| 212197 ||  || — || April 10, 2005 || Mount Lemmon || Mount Lemmon Survey || — || align=right | 2.0 km || 
|-id=198 bgcolor=#E9E9E9
| 212198 ||  || — || April 9, 2005 || Socorro || LINEAR || — || align=right | 1.8 km || 
|-id=199 bgcolor=#E9E9E9
| 212199 ||  || — || April 7, 2005 || Kitt Peak || Spacewatch || — || align=right | 2.4 km || 
|-id=200 bgcolor=#E9E9E9
| 212200 ||  || — || April 10, 2005 || Kitt Peak || Spacewatch || — || align=right data-sort-value="0.96" | 960 m || 
|}

212201–212300 

|-bgcolor=#E9E9E9
| 212201 ||  || — || April 10, 2005 || Mount Lemmon || Mount Lemmon Survey || — || align=right | 1.2 km || 
|-id=202 bgcolor=#E9E9E9
| 212202 ||  || — || April 11, 2005 || Mount Lemmon || Mount Lemmon Survey || MRX || align=right | 1.7 km || 
|-id=203 bgcolor=#E9E9E9
| 212203 ||  || — || April 11, 2005 || Kitt Peak || Spacewatch || ADE || align=right | 2.9 km || 
|-id=204 bgcolor=#E9E9E9
| 212204 ||  || — || April 12, 2005 || Kitt Peak || Spacewatch || — || align=right | 2.8 km || 
|-id=205 bgcolor=#E9E9E9
| 212205 ||  || — || April 12, 2005 || Mount Lemmon || Mount Lemmon Survey || — || align=right | 3.0 km || 
|-id=206 bgcolor=#E9E9E9
| 212206 ||  || — || April 12, 2005 || Kitt Peak || Spacewatch || — || align=right | 3.5 km || 
|-id=207 bgcolor=#E9E9E9
| 212207 ||  || — || April 13, 2005 || Anderson Mesa || LONEOS || RAF || align=right | 1.3 km || 
|-id=208 bgcolor=#E9E9E9
| 212208 ||  || — || April 12, 2005 || Kitt Peak || Spacewatch || — || align=right | 1.9 km || 
|-id=209 bgcolor=#E9E9E9
| 212209 ||  || — || April 15, 2005 || Catalina || CSS || — || align=right | 2.4 km || 
|-id=210 bgcolor=#E9E9E9
| 212210 ||  || — || April 11, 2005 || Mount Lemmon || Mount Lemmon Survey || — || align=right | 2.5 km || 
|-id=211 bgcolor=#E9E9E9
| 212211 ||  || — || April 11, 2005 || Mount Lemmon || Mount Lemmon Survey || — || align=right | 1.9 km || 
|-id=212 bgcolor=#E9E9E9
| 212212 ||  || — || April 11, 2005 || Mount Lemmon || Mount Lemmon Survey || — || align=right | 2.5 km || 
|-id=213 bgcolor=#E9E9E9
| 212213 ||  || — || April 14, 2005 || Kitt Peak || Spacewatch || — || align=right | 1.8 km || 
|-id=214 bgcolor=#E9E9E9
| 212214 ||  || — || April 1, 2005 || Kitt Peak || Spacewatch || — || align=right | 2.5 km || 
|-id=215 bgcolor=#E9E9E9
| 212215 ||  || — || April 10, 2005 || Kitt Peak || M. W. Buie || — || align=right | 1.1 km || 
|-id=216 bgcolor=#E9E9E9
| 212216 ||  || — || April 2, 2005 || Kitt Peak || Spacewatch || — || align=right | 1.7 km || 
|-id=217 bgcolor=#E9E9E9
| 212217 ||  || — || April 11, 2005 || Siding Spring || SSS || — || align=right | 2.1 km || 
|-id=218 bgcolor=#E9E9E9
| 212218 ||  || — || April 11, 2005 || Mount Lemmon || Mount Lemmon Survey || AGN || align=right | 1.6 km || 
|-id=219 bgcolor=#fefefe
| 212219 || 2005 HC || — || April 16, 2005 || Jarnac || Jarnac Obs. || V || align=right | 1.1 km || 
|-id=220 bgcolor=#E9E9E9
| 212220 ||  || — || April 28, 2005 || RAS || A. Lowe || — || align=right | 2.1 km || 
|-id=221 bgcolor=#E9E9E9
| 212221 ||  || — || May 4, 2005 || Mauna Kea || C. Veillet || — || align=right | 1.7 km || 
|-id=222 bgcolor=#E9E9E9
| 212222 ||  || — || May 4, 2005 || Mauna Kea || C. Veillet || — || align=right | 1.3 km || 
|-id=223 bgcolor=#E9E9E9
| 212223 ||  || — || May 1, 2005 || Palomar || NEAT || — || align=right | 1.7 km || 
|-id=224 bgcolor=#E9E9E9
| 212224 ||  || — || May 1, 2005 || Palomar || NEAT || — || align=right | 2.1 km || 
|-id=225 bgcolor=#E9E9E9
| 212225 ||  || — || May 1, 2005 || Kitt Peak || Spacewatch || ADE || align=right | 3.8 km || 
|-id=226 bgcolor=#E9E9E9
| 212226 ||  || — || May 4, 2005 || Catalina || CSS || EUN || align=right | 1.6 km || 
|-id=227 bgcolor=#E9E9E9
| 212227 ||  || — || May 4, 2005 || Kitt Peak || Spacewatch || — || align=right | 2.3 km || 
|-id=228 bgcolor=#E9E9E9
| 212228 ||  || — || May 4, 2005 || Catalina || CSS || — || align=right | 2.6 km || 
|-id=229 bgcolor=#E9E9E9
| 212229 ||  || — || May 6, 2005 || Catalina || CSS || — || align=right | 2.0 km || 
|-id=230 bgcolor=#E9E9E9
| 212230 ||  || — || May 3, 2005 || Kitt Peak || Spacewatch || NEM || align=right | 2.6 km || 
|-id=231 bgcolor=#E9E9E9
| 212231 ||  || — || May 3, 2005 || Socorro || LINEAR || — || align=right | 4.3 km || 
|-id=232 bgcolor=#E9E9E9
| 212232 ||  || — || May 4, 2005 || Kitt Peak || Spacewatch || — || align=right | 1.3 km || 
|-id=233 bgcolor=#E9E9E9
| 212233 ||  || — || May 4, 2005 || Kitt Peak || Spacewatch || JUN || align=right | 2.2 km || 
|-id=234 bgcolor=#E9E9E9
| 212234 ||  || — || May 4, 2005 || Anderson Mesa || LONEOS || 526 || align=right | 4.4 km || 
|-id=235 bgcolor=#E9E9E9
| 212235 ||  || — || May 4, 2005 || Kitt Peak || Spacewatch || — || align=right | 1.4 km || 
|-id=236 bgcolor=#E9E9E9
| 212236 ||  || — || May 4, 2005 || Catalina || CSS || MAR || align=right | 1.3 km || 
|-id=237 bgcolor=#E9E9E9
| 212237 ||  || — || May 4, 2005 || Kitt Peak || Spacewatch || KON || align=right | 2.9 km || 
|-id=238 bgcolor=#E9E9E9
| 212238 ||  || — || May 4, 2005 || Kitt Peak || Spacewatch || — || align=right | 3.4 km || 
|-id=239 bgcolor=#E9E9E9
| 212239 ||  || — || May 7, 2005 || Kitt Peak || Spacewatch || — || align=right | 1.9 km || 
|-id=240 bgcolor=#E9E9E9
| 212240 ||  || — || May 8, 2005 || Kitt Peak || Spacewatch || — || align=right | 3.5 km || 
|-id=241 bgcolor=#E9E9E9
| 212241 ||  || — || May 8, 2005 || Mount Lemmon || Mount Lemmon Survey || — || align=right | 1.4 km || 
|-id=242 bgcolor=#E9E9E9
| 212242 ||  || — || May 4, 2005 || Kitt Peak || Spacewatch || — || align=right | 1.2 km || 
|-id=243 bgcolor=#E9E9E9
| 212243 ||  || — || May 7, 2005 || Kitt Peak || Spacewatch || — || align=right | 2.1 km || 
|-id=244 bgcolor=#E9E9E9
| 212244 ||  || — || May 7, 2005 || Kitt Peak || Spacewatch || HEN || align=right | 1.1 km || 
|-id=245 bgcolor=#E9E9E9
| 212245 ||  || — || May 4, 2005 || Palomar || NEAT || ADE || align=right | 3.1 km || 
|-id=246 bgcolor=#E9E9E9
| 212246 ||  || — || May 4, 2005 || Palomar || NEAT || — || align=right | 2.2 km || 
|-id=247 bgcolor=#E9E9E9
| 212247 ||  || — || May 4, 2005 || Palomar || NEAT || — || align=right | 2.6 km || 
|-id=248 bgcolor=#E9E9E9
| 212248 ||  || — || May 6, 2005 || Socorro || LINEAR || — || align=right | 3.6 km || 
|-id=249 bgcolor=#E9E9E9
| 212249 ||  || — || May 6, 2005 || Catalina || CSS || EUN || align=right | 2.0 km || 
|-id=250 bgcolor=#E9E9E9
| 212250 ||  || — || May 9, 2005 || Mount Lemmon || Mount Lemmon Survey || — || align=right | 2.6 km || 
|-id=251 bgcolor=#E9E9E9
| 212251 ||  || — || May 8, 2005 || Kitt Peak || Spacewatch || — || align=right | 1.2 km || 
|-id=252 bgcolor=#d6d6d6
| 212252 ||  || — || May 8, 2005 || Kitt Peak || Spacewatch || KOR || align=right | 1.4 km || 
|-id=253 bgcolor=#E9E9E9
| 212253 ||  || — || May 10, 2005 || Mount Lemmon || Mount Lemmon Survey || — || align=right | 3.5 km || 
|-id=254 bgcolor=#E9E9E9
| 212254 ||  || — || May 11, 2005 || Kitt Peak || Spacewatch || — || align=right | 1.7 km || 
|-id=255 bgcolor=#E9E9E9
| 212255 ||  || — || May 11, 2005 || Palomar || NEAT || MIT || align=right | 3.5 km || 
|-id=256 bgcolor=#E9E9E9
| 212256 ||  || — || May 7, 2005 || Kitt Peak || Spacewatch || — || align=right | 2.7 km || 
|-id=257 bgcolor=#E9E9E9
| 212257 ||  || — || May 12, 2005 || Palomar || NEAT || — || align=right | 6.3 km || 
|-id=258 bgcolor=#E9E9E9
| 212258 ||  || — || May 8, 2005 || Kitt Peak || Spacewatch || NEM || align=right | 3.8 km || 
|-id=259 bgcolor=#E9E9E9
| 212259 ||  || — || May 8, 2005 || Kitt Peak || Spacewatch || — || align=right | 3.1 km || 
|-id=260 bgcolor=#E9E9E9
| 212260 ||  || — || May 8, 2005 || Socorro || LINEAR || ADE || align=right | 3.6 km || 
|-id=261 bgcolor=#fefefe
| 212261 ||  || — || May 10, 2005 || Kitt Peak || Spacewatch || — || align=right data-sort-value="0.77" | 770 m || 
|-id=262 bgcolor=#E9E9E9
| 212262 ||  || — || May 10, 2005 || Kitt Peak || Spacewatch || WIT || align=right | 1.3 km || 
|-id=263 bgcolor=#E9E9E9
| 212263 ||  || — || May 10, 2005 || Kitt Peak || Spacewatch || WIT || align=right | 1.6 km || 
|-id=264 bgcolor=#E9E9E9
| 212264 ||  || — || May 11, 2005 || Kitt Peak || Spacewatch || ADE || align=right | 4.1 km || 
|-id=265 bgcolor=#E9E9E9
| 212265 ||  || — || May 12, 2005 || Mount Lemmon || Mount Lemmon Survey || — || align=right | 1.4 km || 
|-id=266 bgcolor=#E9E9E9
| 212266 ||  || — || May 12, 2005 || Socorro || LINEAR || — || align=right | 2.1 km || 
|-id=267 bgcolor=#E9E9E9
| 212267 ||  || — || May 13, 2005 || Kitt Peak || Spacewatch || RAF || align=right | 1.9 km || 
|-id=268 bgcolor=#E9E9E9
| 212268 ||  || — || May 13, 2005 || Siding Spring || SSS || EUN || align=right | 3.0 km || 
|-id=269 bgcolor=#E9E9E9
| 212269 ||  || — || May 12, 2005 || Kitt Peak || Spacewatch || JUN || align=right | 1.3 km || 
|-id=270 bgcolor=#E9E9E9
| 212270 ||  || — || May 12, 2005 || Kitt Peak || Spacewatch || — || align=right | 2.7 km || 
|-id=271 bgcolor=#E9E9E9
| 212271 ||  || — || May 14, 2005 || Socorro || LINEAR || — || align=right | 2.2 km || 
|-id=272 bgcolor=#E9E9E9
| 212272 ||  || — || May 15, 2005 || Mount Lemmon || Mount Lemmon Survey || — || align=right | 1.6 km || 
|-id=273 bgcolor=#E9E9E9
| 212273 ||  || — || May 13, 2005 || Catalina || CSS || EUN || align=right | 2.2 km || 
|-id=274 bgcolor=#d6d6d6
| 212274 ||  || — || May 15, 2005 || Palomar || NEAT || — || align=right | 3.6 km || 
|-id=275 bgcolor=#E9E9E9
| 212275 ||  || — || May 4, 2005 || Kitt Peak || Spacewatch || — || align=right | 2.9 km || 
|-id=276 bgcolor=#E9E9E9
| 212276 ||  || — || May 16, 2005 || Mount Lemmon || Mount Lemmon Survey || — || align=right | 2.2 km || 
|-id=277 bgcolor=#E9E9E9
| 212277 ||  || — || May 16, 2005 || Kitt Peak || Spacewatch || — || align=right | 1.7 km || 
|-id=278 bgcolor=#E9E9E9
| 212278 ||  || — || May 21, 2005 || Mount Lemmon || Mount Lemmon Survey || — || align=right | 1.5 km || 
|-id=279 bgcolor=#E9E9E9
| 212279 ||  || — || May 30, 2005 || Catalina || CSS || BRU || align=right | 5.1 km || 
|-id=280 bgcolor=#E9E9E9
| 212280 ||  || — || June 1, 2005 || Mount Lemmon || Mount Lemmon Survey || GEF || align=right | 3.2 km || 
|-id=281 bgcolor=#E9E9E9
| 212281 ||  || — || June 2, 2005 || Socorro || LINEAR || GAL || align=right | 2.5 km || 
|-id=282 bgcolor=#E9E9E9
| 212282 ||  || — || June 1, 2005 || Mount Lemmon || Mount Lemmon Survey || — || align=right | 3.2 km || 
|-id=283 bgcolor=#E9E9E9
| 212283 ||  || — || June 5, 2005 || Socorro || LINEAR || — || align=right | 3.5 km || 
|-id=284 bgcolor=#d6d6d6
| 212284 ||  || — || June 8, 2005 || Kitt Peak || Spacewatch || — || align=right | 3.1 km || 
|-id=285 bgcolor=#E9E9E9
| 212285 ||  || — || June 10, 2005 || Kitt Peak || Spacewatch || — || align=right | 3.1 km || 
|-id=286 bgcolor=#E9E9E9
| 212286 ||  || — || June 10, 2005 || Kitt Peak || Spacewatch || HEN || align=right | 1.4 km || 
|-id=287 bgcolor=#d6d6d6
| 212287 ||  || — || June 11, 2005 || Kitt Peak || Spacewatch || — || align=right | 2.6 km || 
|-id=288 bgcolor=#E9E9E9
| 212288 ||  || — || June 13, 2005 || Kitt Peak || Spacewatch || ADE || align=right | 3.8 km || 
|-id=289 bgcolor=#E9E9E9
| 212289 ||  || — || June 23, 2005 || Palomar || NEAT || — || align=right | 1.7 km || 
|-id=290 bgcolor=#E9E9E9
| 212290 ||  || — || June 24, 2005 || Palomar || NEAT || PAD || align=right | 3.7 km || 
|-id=291 bgcolor=#d6d6d6
| 212291 ||  || — || June 27, 2005 || Kitt Peak || Spacewatch || — || align=right | 3.4 km || 
|-id=292 bgcolor=#d6d6d6
| 212292 ||  || — || June 29, 2005 || Palomar || NEAT || — || align=right | 3.6 km || 
|-id=293 bgcolor=#d6d6d6
| 212293 ||  || — || June 29, 2005 || Kitt Peak || Spacewatch || EOS || align=right | 5.3 km || 
|-id=294 bgcolor=#d6d6d6
| 212294 ||  || — || June 30, 2005 || Kitt Peak || Spacewatch || HYG || align=right | 3.4 km || 
|-id=295 bgcolor=#d6d6d6
| 212295 ||  || — || June 27, 2005 || Kitt Peak || Spacewatch || — || align=right | 7.0 km || 
|-id=296 bgcolor=#d6d6d6
| 212296 ||  || — || July 3, 2005 || Mount Lemmon || Mount Lemmon Survey || LAU || align=right | 1.5 km || 
|-id=297 bgcolor=#E9E9E9
| 212297 ||  || — || July 3, 2005 || Kitt Peak || Spacewatch || PAD || align=right | 2.7 km || 
|-id=298 bgcolor=#d6d6d6
| 212298 ||  || — || July 4, 2005 || Kitt Peak || Spacewatch || — || align=right | 3.3 km || 
|-id=299 bgcolor=#d6d6d6
| 212299 ||  || — || July 5, 2005 || Kitt Peak || Spacewatch || — || align=right | 3.3 km || 
|-id=300 bgcolor=#d6d6d6
| 212300 ||  || — || July 4, 2005 || Kitt Peak || Spacewatch || THM || align=right | 2.8 km || 
|}

212301–212400 

|-bgcolor=#d6d6d6
| 212301 ||  || — || July 10, 2005 || Kitt Peak || Spacewatch || HYG || align=right | 3.9 km || 
|-id=302 bgcolor=#d6d6d6
| 212302 ||  || — || July 6, 2005 || Kitt Peak || Spacewatch || VER || align=right | 5.2 km || 
|-id=303 bgcolor=#d6d6d6
| 212303 ||  || — || July 5, 2005 || Palomar || NEAT || — || align=right | 3.1 km || 
|-id=304 bgcolor=#d6d6d6
| 212304 ||  || — || July 7, 2005 || Kitt Peak || Spacewatch || KAR || align=right | 1.6 km || 
|-id=305 bgcolor=#E9E9E9
| 212305 ||  || — || July 12, 2005 || Catalina || CSS || — || align=right | 1.9 km || 
|-id=306 bgcolor=#fefefe
| 212306 ||  || — || July 28, 2005 || Palomar || NEAT || FLO || align=right data-sort-value="0.86" | 860 m || 
|-id=307 bgcolor=#d6d6d6
| 212307 ||  || — || July 28, 2005 || Palomar || NEAT || — || align=right | 4.1 km || 
|-id=308 bgcolor=#d6d6d6
| 212308 ||  || — || July 28, 2005 || Palomar || NEAT || VER || align=right | 3.7 km || 
|-id=309 bgcolor=#d6d6d6
| 212309 ||  || — || July 29, 2005 || Palomar || NEAT || — || align=right | 5.4 km || 
|-id=310 bgcolor=#d6d6d6
| 212310 ||  || — || August 24, 2005 || Palomar || NEAT || — || align=right | 3.5 km || 
|-id=311 bgcolor=#d6d6d6
| 212311 ||  || — || August 26, 2005 || Anderson Mesa || LONEOS || — || align=right | 4.0 km || 
|-id=312 bgcolor=#d6d6d6
| 212312 ||  || — || August 27, 2005 || Kitt Peak || Spacewatch || TIR || align=right | 3.6 km || 
|-id=313 bgcolor=#d6d6d6
| 212313 ||  || — || August 25, 2005 || Palomar || NEAT || — || align=right | 3.2 km || 
|-id=314 bgcolor=#d6d6d6
| 212314 ||  || — || August 26, 2005 || Anderson Mesa || LONEOS || HYG || align=right | 5.5 km || 
|-id=315 bgcolor=#d6d6d6
| 212315 ||  || — || August 28, 2005 || Kitt Peak || Spacewatch || — || align=right | 3.7 km || 
|-id=316 bgcolor=#d6d6d6
| 212316 ||  || — || August 26, 2005 || Anderson Mesa || LONEOS || LIX || align=right | 5.0 km || 
|-id=317 bgcolor=#d6d6d6
| 212317 ||  || — || August 26, 2005 || Palomar || NEAT || — || align=right | 3.3 km || 
|-id=318 bgcolor=#d6d6d6
| 212318 ||  || — || August 29, 2005 || Socorro || LINEAR || — || align=right | 3.4 km || 
|-id=319 bgcolor=#d6d6d6
| 212319 ||  || — || August 29, 2005 || Anderson Mesa || LONEOS || HYG || align=right | 4.1 km || 
|-id=320 bgcolor=#d6d6d6
| 212320 ||  || — || August 27, 2005 || Palomar || NEAT || — || align=right | 3.5 km || 
|-id=321 bgcolor=#E9E9E9
| 212321 ||  || — || August 28, 2005 || Kitt Peak || Spacewatch || — || align=right | 2.0 km || 
|-id=322 bgcolor=#d6d6d6
| 212322 ||  || — || August 28, 2005 || Siding Spring || SSS || — || align=right | 4.8 km || 
|-id=323 bgcolor=#d6d6d6
| 212323 ||  || — || August 30, 2005 || Palomar || NEAT || SYL7:4 || align=right | 6.7 km || 
|-id=324 bgcolor=#d6d6d6
| 212324 ||  || — || September 1, 2005 || Kitt Peak || Spacewatch || HYG || align=right | 3.4 km || 
|-id=325 bgcolor=#d6d6d6
| 212325 ||  || — || September 23, 2005 || Kitt Peak || Spacewatch || HYG || align=right | 3.6 km || 
|-id=326 bgcolor=#d6d6d6
| 212326 ||  || — || September 23, 2005 || Kitt Peak || Spacewatch || THM || align=right | 3.5 km || 
|-id=327 bgcolor=#d6d6d6
| 212327 ||  || — || September 25, 2005 || Kitt Peak || Spacewatch || — || align=right | 3.5 km || 
|-id=328 bgcolor=#d6d6d6
| 212328 ||  || — || September 26, 2005 || Kitt Peak || Spacewatch || TIR || align=right | 3.5 km || 
|-id=329 bgcolor=#d6d6d6
| 212329 ||  || — || September 23, 2005 || Catalina || CSS || — || align=right | 3.6 km || 
|-id=330 bgcolor=#E9E9E9
| 212330 ||  || — || September 24, 2005 || Kitt Peak || Spacewatch || NEM || align=right | 3.2 km || 
|-id=331 bgcolor=#d6d6d6
| 212331 ||  || — || September 29, 2005 || Kitt Peak || Spacewatch || — || align=right | 6.4 km || 
|-id=332 bgcolor=#E9E9E9
| 212332 ||  || — || September 25, 2005 || Kitt Peak || Spacewatch || — || align=right | 1.9 km || 
|-id=333 bgcolor=#d6d6d6
| 212333 ||  || — || September 29, 2005 || Palomar || NEAT || EUP || align=right | 5.8 km || 
|-id=334 bgcolor=#d6d6d6
| 212334 ||  || — || September 30, 2005 || Mount Lemmon || Mount Lemmon Survey || 3:2 || align=right | 5.2 km || 
|-id=335 bgcolor=#d6d6d6
| 212335 ||  || — || September 30, 2005 || Mount Lemmon || Mount Lemmon Survey || — || align=right | 2.9 km || 
|-id=336 bgcolor=#d6d6d6
| 212336 ||  || — || September 30, 2005 || Kitt Peak || Spacewatch || KOR || align=right | 1.3 km || 
|-id=337 bgcolor=#d6d6d6
| 212337 ||  || — || September 30, 2005 || Mount Lemmon || Mount Lemmon Survey || 3:2 || align=right | 5.4 km || 
|-id=338 bgcolor=#d6d6d6
| 212338 ||  || — || September 23, 2005 || Kitt Peak || Spacewatch || — || align=right | 3.0 km || 
|-id=339 bgcolor=#d6d6d6
| 212339 ||  || — || September 25, 2005 || Kitt Peak || Spacewatch || HYG || align=right | 5.1 km || 
|-id=340 bgcolor=#d6d6d6
| 212340 ||  || — || October 1, 2005 || Catalina || CSS || — || align=right | 2.8 km || 
|-id=341 bgcolor=#d6d6d6
| 212341 ||  || — || October 6, 2005 || Mount Lemmon || Mount Lemmon Survey || 628 || align=right | 2.2 km || 
|-id=342 bgcolor=#E9E9E9
| 212342 ||  || — || October 7, 2005 || Kitt Peak || Spacewatch || HEN || align=right | 1.4 km || 
|-id=343 bgcolor=#d6d6d6
| 212343 ||  || — || October 6, 2005 || Kitt Peak || Spacewatch || — || align=right | 5.8 km || 
|-id=344 bgcolor=#d6d6d6
| 212344 ||  || — || October 22, 2005 || Kitt Peak || Spacewatch || 3:2 || align=right | 6.4 km || 
|-id=345 bgcolor=#d6d6d6
| 212345 ||  || — || October 22, 2005 || Kitt Peak || Spacewatch || SHU3:2 || align=right | 7.7 km || 
|-id=346 bgcolor=#d6d6d6
| 212346 ||  || — || October 23, 2005 || Palomar || NEAT || LIX || align=right | 6.4 km || 
|-id=347 bgcolor=#d6d6d6
| 212347 ||  || — || October 24, 2005 || Kitt Peak || Spacewatch || — || align=right | 4.1 km || 
|-id=348 bgcolor=#d6d6d6
| 212348 ||  || — || October 24, 2005 || Kitt Peak || Spacewatch || — || align=right | 2.8 km || 
|-id=349 bgcolor=#fefefe
| 212349 ||  || — || October 24, 2005 || Kitt Peak || Spacewatch || NYS || align=right data-sort-value="0.83" | 830 m || 
|-id=350 bgcolor=#d6d6d6
| 212350 ||  || — || November 3, 2005 || Kitt Peak || Spacewatch || — || align=right | 4.2 km || 
|-id=351 bgcolor=#E9E9E9
| 212351 ||  || — || December 1, 2005 || Mount Lemmon || Mount Lemmon Survey || HEN || align=right | 1.1 km || 
|-id=352 bgcolor=#fefefe
| 212352 ||  || — || December 22, 2005 || Catalina || CSS || H || align=right data-sort-value="0.89" | 890 m || 
|-id=353 bgcolor=#fefefe
| 212353 ||  || — || December 22, 2005 || Catalina || CSS || H || align=right data-sort-value="0.89" | 890 m || 
|-id=354 bgcolor=#E9E9E9
| 212354 ||  || — || January 23, 2006 || Mount Lemmon || Mount Lemmon Survey || — || align=right | 1.6 km || 
|-id=355 bgcolor=#fefefe
| 212355 ||  || — || February 20, 2006 || Mount Lemmon || Mount Lemmon Survey || — || align=right | 1.0 km || 
|-id=356 bgcolor=#fefefe
| 212356 ||  || — || February 24, 2006 || Kitt Peak || Spacewatch || — || align=right data-sort-value="0.84" | 840 m || 
|-id=357 bgcolor=#fefefe
| 212357 ||  || — || February 27, 2006 || Kitt Peak || Spacewatch || — || align=right | 1.3 km || 
|-id=358 bgcolor=#fefefe
| 212358 ||  || — || February 25, 2006 || Kitt Peak || Spacewatch || — || align=right | 1.0 km || 
|-id=359 bgcolor=#FFC2E0
| 212359 ||  || — || March 2, 2006 || Kitt Peak || Spacewatch || APO +1km || align=right | 1.3 km || 
|-id=360 bgcolor=#fefefe
| 212360 ||  || — || March 23, 2006 || Catalina || CSS || — || align=right | 1.5 km || 
|-id=361 bgcolor=#fefefe
| 212361 ||  || — || March 24, 2006 || Kitt Peak || Spacewatch || NYS || align=right data-sort-value="0.75" | 750 m || 
|-id=362 bgcolor=#fefefe
| 212362 ||  || — || March 26, 2006 || Mount Lemmon || Mount Lemmon Survey || — || align=right data-sort-value="0.97" | 970 m || 
|-id=363 bgcolor=#fefefe
| 212363 ||  || — || April 2, 2006 || Kitt Peak || Spacewatch || — || align=right data-sort-value="0.85" | 850 m || 
|-id=364 bgcolor=#fefefe
| 212364 ||  || — || April 2, 2006 || Kitt Peak || Spacewatch || — || align=right | 1.7 km || 
|-id=365 bgcolor=#fefefe
| 212365 ||  || — || April 2, 2006 || Kitt Peak || Spacewatch || — || align=right data-sort-value="0.68" | 680 m || 
|-id=366 bgcolor=#fefefe
| 212366 ||  || — || April 2, 2006 || Kitt Peak || Spacewatch || FLO || align=right | 1.1 km || 
|-id=367 bgcolor=#fefefe
| 212367 ||  || — || April 7, 2006 || Kitt Peak || Spacewatch || — || align=right data-sort-value="0.71" | 710 m || 
|-id=368 bgcolor=#fefefe
| 212368 ||  || — || April 2, 2006 || Catalina || CSS || PHO || align=right | 4.1 km || 
|-id=369 bgcolor=#d6d6d6
| 212369 ||  || — || April 8, 2006 || Mount Lemmon || Mount Lemmon Survey || HIL3:2 || align=right | 9.6 km || 
|-id=370 bgcolor=#fefefe
| 212370 ||  || — || April 6, 2006 || Catalina || CSS || — || align=right | 1.1 km || 
|-id=371 bgcolor=#fefefe
| 212371 ||  || — || April 19, 2006 || Catalina || CSS || — || align=right data-sort-value="0.97" | 970 m || 
|-id=372 bgcolor=#fefefe
| 212372 ||  || — || April 19, 2006 || Palomar || NEAT || — || align=right data-sort-value="0.95" | 950 m || 
|-id=373 bgcolor=#fefefe
| 212373 Pietrocascella ||  ||  || April 22, 2006 || Vallemare di Borbona || V. S. Casulli || — || align=right | 2.1 km || 
|-id=374 bgcolor=#fefefe
| 212374 Vellerat ||  ||  || April 21, 2006 || Vicques || M. Ory || — || align=right | 1.1 km || 
|-id=375 bgcolor=#d6d6d6
| 212375 ||  || — || April 19, 2006 || Catalina || CSS || — || align=right | 4.6 km || 
|-id=376 bgcolor=#fefefe
| 212376 ||  || — || April 19, 2006 || Catalina || CSS || — || align=right | 1.1 km || 
|-id=377 bgcolor=#fefefe
| 212377 ||  || — || April 21, 2006 || Kitt Peak || Spacewatch || — || align=right data-sort-value="0.96" | 960 m || 
|-id=378 bgcolor=#fefefe
| 212378 ||  || — || April 24, 2006 || Mount Lemmon || Mount Lemmon Survey || — || align=right | 1.2 km || 
|-id=379 bgcolor=#fefefe
| 212379 ||  || — || April 21, 2006 || Catalina || CSS || FLO || align=right data-sort-value="0.85" | 850 m || 
|-id=380 bgcolor=#fefefe
| 212380 ||  || — || April 24, 2006 || Socorro || LINEAR || — || align=right | 1.3 km || 
|-id=381 bgcolor=#fefefe
| 212381 ||  || — || April 24, 2006 || Anderson Mesa || LONEOS || — || align=right data-sort-value="0.92" | 920 m || 
|-id=382 bgcolor=#fefefe
| 212382 ||  || — || April 24, 2006 || Kitt Peak || Spacewatch || FLO || align=right data-sort-value="0.75" | 750 m || 
|-id=383 bgcolor=#fefefe
| 212383 ||  || — || April 25, 2006 || Palomar || NEAT || — || align=right | 1.0 km || 
|-id=384 bgcolor=#fefefe
| 212384 ||  || — || April 26, 2006 || Kitt Peak || Spacewatch || — || align=right data-sort-value="0.91" | 910 m || 
|-id=385 bgcolor=#fefefe
| 212385 ||  || — || April 26, 2006 || Kitt Peak || Spacewatch || — || align=right data-sort-value="0.87" | 870 m || 
|-id=386 bgcolor=#fefefe
| 212386 ||  || — || April 27, 2006 || Socorro || LINEAR || — || align=right | 1.0 km || 
|-id=387 bgcolor=#fefefe
| 212387 ||  || — || April 30, 2006 || Kitt Peak || Spacewatch || FLO || align=right data-sort-value="0.81" | 810 m || 
|-id=388 bgcolor=#fefefe
| 212388 ||  || — || April 30, 2006 || Catalina || CSS || — || align=right data-sort-value="0.98" | 980 m || 
|-id=389 bgcolor=#fefefe
| 212389 ||  || — || April 30, 2006 || Catalina || CSS || FLO || align=right data-sort-value="0.87" | 870 m || 
|-id=390 bgcolor=#fefefe
| 212390 ||  || — || April 21, 2006 || Catalina || CSS || — || align=right data-sort-value="0.92" | 920 m || 
|-id=391 bgcolor=#fefefe
| 212391 ||  || — || April 26, 2006 || Socorro || LINEAR || FLO || align=right | 1.1 km || 
|-id=392 bgcolor=#fefefe
| 212392 ||  || — || April 26, 2006 || Cerro Tololo || M. W. Buie || NYS || align=right | 1.0 km || 
|-id=393 bgcolor=#fefefe
| 212393 ||  || — || April 26, 2006 || Mount Lemmon || Mount Lemmon Survey || NYS || align=right | 1.8 km || 
|-id=394 bgcolor=#fefefe
| 212394 ||  || — || May 1, 2006 || Kitt Peak || Spacewatch || — || align=right data-sort-value="0.87" | 870 m || 
|-id=395 bgcolor=#fefefe
| 212395 ||  || — || May 1, 2006 || Kitt Peak || Spacewatch || — || align=right | 1.2 km || 
|-id=396 bgcolor=#fefefe
| 212396 ||  || — || May 2, 2006 || Mount Lemmon || Mount Lemmon Survey || — || align=right | 1.1 km || 
|-id=397 bgcolor=#fefefe
| 212397 ||  || — || May 3, 2006 || Mount Lemmon || Mount Lemmon Survey || — || align=right | 2.1 km || 
|-id=398 bgcolor=#fefefe
| 212398 ||  || — || May 1, 2006 || Kitt Peak || Spacewatch || — || align=right data-sort-value="0.72" | 720 m || 
|-id=399 bgcolor=#fefefe
| 212399 ||  || — || May 6, 2006 || Mount Lemmon || Mount Lemmon Survey || — || align=right data-sort-value="0.78" | 780 m || 
|-id=400 bgcolor=#fefefe
| 212400 ||  || — || May 6, 2006 || Mount Lemmon || Mount Lemmon Survey || NYS || align=right data-sort-value="0.91" | 910 m || 
|}

212401–212500 

|-bgcolor=#fefefe
| 212401 ||  || — || May 2, 2006 || Mount Lemmon || Mount Lemmon Survey || — || align=right | 1.3 km || 
|-id=402 bgcolor=#fefefe
| 212402 ||  || — || May 8, 2006 || Kitt Peak || Spacewatch || — || align=right data-sort-value="0.92" | 920 m || 
|-id=403 bgcolor=#fefefe
| 212403 ||  || — || May 1, 2006 || Kitt Peak || M. W. Buie || — || align=right | 1.0 km || 
|-id=404 bgcolor=#fefefe
| 212404 ||  || — || May 20, 2006 || Reedy Creek || J. Broughton || FLO || align=right | 2.1 km || 
|-id=405 bgcolor=#fefefe
| 212405 ||  || — || May 19, 2006 || Mount Lemmon || Mount Lemmon Survey || — || align=right | 1.2 km || 
|-id=406 bgcolor=#fefefe
| 212406 ||  || — || May 23, 2006 || Reedy Creek || J. Broughton || — || align=right | 1.1 km || 
|-id=407 bgcolor=#fefefe
| 212407 ||  || — || May 20, 2006 || Mount Lemmon || Mount Lemmon Survey || — || align=right data-sort-value="0.88" | 880 m || 
|-id=408 bgcolor=#fefefe
| 212408 ||  || — || May 20, 2006 || Kitt Peak || Spacewatch || — || align=right data-sort-value="0.72" | 720 m || 
|-id=409 bgcolor=#fefefe
| 212409 ||  || — || May 21, 2006 || Kitt Peak || Spacewatch || — || align=right data-sort-value="0.68" | 680 m || 
|-id=410 bgcolor=#fefefe
| 212410 ||  || — || May 18, 2006 || Palomar || NEAT || — || align=right | 1.5 km || 
|-id=411 bgcolor=#fefefe
| 212411 ||  || — || May 20, 2006 || Mount Lemmon || Mount Lemmon Survey || — || align=right | 1.5 km || 
|-id=412 bgcolor=#fefefe
| 212412 ||  || — || May 22, 2006 || Kitt Peak || Spacewatch || NYS || align=right data-sort-value="0.93" | 930 m || 
|-id=413 bgcolor=#fefefe
| 212413 ||  || — || May 22, 2006 || Kitt Peak || Spacewatch || V || align=right data-sort-value="0.68" | 680 m || 
|-id=414 bgcolor=#fefefe
| 212414 ||  || — || May 20, 2006 || Siding Spring || SSS || — || align=right data-sort-value="0.83" | 830 m || 
|-id=415 bgcolor=#E9E9E9
| 212415 ||  || — || May 26, 2006 || Catalina || CSS || — || align=right | 2.7 km || 
|-id=416 bgcolor=#fefefe
| 212416 ||  || — || May 24, 2006 || Palomar || NEAT || — || align=right data-sort-value="0.78" | 780 m || 
|-id=417 bgcolor=#fefefe
| 212417 ||  || — || May 28, 2006 || Siding Spring || SSS || CIM || align=right | 3.5 km || 
|-id=418 bgcolor=#fefefe
| 212418 ||  || — || May 18, 2006 || Palomar || NEAT || — || align=right | 1.1 km || 
|-id=419 bgcolor=#fefefe
| 212419 ||  || — || May 20, 2006 || Catalina || CSS || — || align=right data-sort-value="0.98" | 980 m || 
|-id=420 bgcolor=#fefefe
| 212420 ||  || — || May 29, 2006 || Kitt Peak || Spacewatch || — || align=right | 1.1 km || 
|-id=421 bgcolor=#fefefe
| 212421 ||  || — || May 19, 2006 || Catalina || CSS || — || align=right | 1.1 km || 
|-id=422 bgcolor=#fefefe
| 212422 ||  || — || June 11, 2006 || Palomar || NEAT || — || align=right | 1.6 km || 
|-id=423 bgcolor=#E9E9E9
| 212423 ||  || — || June 18, 2006 || Kitt Peak || Spacewatch || MAR || align=right | 1.4 km || 
|-id=424 bgcolor=#E9E9E9
| 212424 ||  || — || June 19, 2006 || Mount Lemmon || Mount Lemmon Survey || — || align=right | 1.7 km || 
|-id=425 bgcolor=#fefefe
| 212425 ||  || — || June 20, 2006 || Hibiscus || S. F. Hönig || NYS || align=right | 1.8 km || 
|-id=426 bgcolor=#fefefe
| 212426 || 2006 OB || — || July 16, 2006 || Hibiscus || N. Teamo, S. F. Hönig || NYS || align=right data-sort-value="0.94" | 940 m || 
|-id=427 bgcolor=#fefefe
| 212427 || 2006 OL || — || July 17, 2006 || RAS || iTelescope Obs. || NYS || align=right data-sort-value="0.79" | 790 m || 
|-id=428 bgcolor=#fefefe
| 212428 ||  || — || July 18, 2006 || Reedy Creek || J. Broughton || MAS || align=right | 1.1 km || 
|-id=429 bgcolor=#fefefe
| 212429 ||  || — || July 21, 2006 || Mount Lemmon || Mount Lemmon Survey || NYS || align=right | 1.1 km || 
|-id=430 bgcolor=#fefefe
| 212430 ||  || — || July 19, 2006 || Palomar || NEAT || MAS || align=right | 1.1 km || 
|-id=431 bgcolor=#fefefe
| 212431 ||  || — || July 20, 2006 || Palomar || NEAT || NYS || align=right data-sort-value="0.91" | 910 m || 
|-id=432 bgcolor=#fefefe
| 212432 ||  || — || July 20, 2006 || Palomar || NEAT || NYS || align=right data-sort-value="0.83" | 830 m || 
|-id=433 bgcolor=#E9E9E9
| 212433 ||  || — || July 26, 2006 || Siding Spring || SSS || — || align=right | 1.8 km || 
|-id=434 bgcolor=#E9E9E9
| 212434 ||  || — || July 29, 2006 || Reedy Creek || J. Broughton || HNS || align=right | 1.9 km || 
|-id=435 bgcolor=#fefefe
| 212435 ||  || — || July 18, 2006 || Mount Lemmon || Mount Lemmon Survey || NYS || align=right | 1.1 km || 
|-id=436 bgcolor=#E9E9E9
| 212436 ||  || — || July 31, 2006 || Siding Spring || SSS || — || align=right | 1.9 km || 
|-id=437 bgcolor=#fefefe
| 212437 ||  || — || August 14, 2006 || Siding Spring || SSS || — || align=right data-sort-value="0.84" | 840 m || 
|-id=438 bgcolor=#E9E9E9
| 212438 ||  || — || August 14, 2006 || Siding Spring || SSS || — || align=right | 1.9 km || 
|-id=439 bgcolor=#E9E9E9
| 212439 ||  || — || August 15, 2006 || Palomar || NEAT || — || align=right | 3.1 km || 
|-id=440 bgcolor=#fefefe
| 212440 ||  || — || August 13, 2006 || Palomar || NEAT || NYS || align=right data-sort-value="0.80" | 800 m || 
|-id=441 bgcolor=#fefefe
| 212441 ||  || — || August 13, 2006 || Palomar || NEAT || NYS || align=right data-sort-value="0.87" | 870 m || 
|-id=442 bgcolor=#fefefe
| 212442 ||  || — || August 12, 2006 || Palomar || NEAT || MAS || align=right | 1.0 km || 
|-id=443 bgcolor=#fefefe
| 212443 ||  || — || August 12, 2006 || Palomar || NEAT || — || align=right | 2.0 km || 
|-id=444 bgcolor=#E9E9E9
| 212444 ||  || — || August 12, 2006 || Palomar || NEAT || — || align=right | 3.2 km || 
|-id=445 bgcolor=#fefefe
| 212445 ||  || — || August 11, 2006 || Palomar || NEAT || NYS || align=right | 3.0 km || 
|-id=446 bgcolor=#d6d6d6
| 212446 ||  || — || August 14, 2006 || Palomar || NEAT || — || align=right | 4.3 km || 
|-id=447 bgcolor=#d6d6d6
| 212447 ||  || — || August 14, 2006 || Palomar || NEAT || EOS || align=right | 2.6 km || 
|-id=448 bgcolor=#d6d6d6
| 212448 ||  || — || August 14, 2006 || Palomar || NEAT || EOS || align=right | 2.3 km || 
|-id=449 bgcolor=#E9E9E9
| 212449 ||  || — || August 14, 2006 || Siding Spring || SSS || MRX || align=right | 1.5 km || 
|-id=450 bgcolor=#fefefe
| 212450 || 2006 QO || — || August 16, 2006 || Reedy Creek || J. Broughton || — || align=right | 1.3 km || 
|-id=451 bgcolor=#d6d6d6
| 212451 ||  || — || August 17, 2006 || Palomar || NEAT || KOR || align=right | 1.8 km || 
|-id=452 bgcolor=#fefefe
| 212452 ||  || — || August 17, 2006 || Palomar || NEAT || V || align=right | 1.1 km || 
|-id=453 bgcolor=#E9E9E9
| 212453 ||  || — || August 17, 2006 || Palomar || NEAT || — || align=right | 1.2 km || 
|-id=454 bgcolor=#d6d6d6
| 212454 ||  || — || August 18, 2006 || Anderson Mesa || LONEOS || — || align=right | 4.6 km || 
|-id=455 bgcolor=#fefefe
| 212455 ||  || — || August 18, 2006 || Anderson Mesa || LONEOS || — || align=right | 1.1 km || 
|-id=456 bgcolor=#d6d6d6
| 212456 ||  || — || August 18, 2006 || Anderson Mesa || LONEOS || — || align=right | 5.4 km || 
|-id=457 bgcolor=#fefefe
| 212457 ||  || — || August 19, 2006 || Anderson Mesa || LONEOS || — || align=right | 1.5 km || 
|-id=458 bgcolor=#d6d6d6
| 212458 ||  || — || August 17, 2006 || Palomar || NEAT || — || align=right | 6.4 km || 
|-id=459 bgcolor=#d6d6d6
| 212459 ||  || — || August 19, 2006 || Kitt Peak || Spacewatch || — || align=right | 3.8 km || 
|-id=460 bgcolor=#fefefe
| 212460 ||  || — || August 20, 2006 || Kitt Peak || Spacewatch || ERI || align=right | 3.3 km || 
|-id=461 bgcolor=#fefefe
| 212461 ||  || — || August 17, 2006 || Palomar || NEAT || NYS || align=right | 1.0 km || 
|-id=462 bgcolor=#fefefe
| 212462 ||  || — || August 20, 2006 || Palomar || NEAT || MAS || align=right | 1.1 km || 
|-id=463 bgcolor=#E9E9E9
| 212463 ||  || — || August 21, 2006 || Palomar || NEAT || — || align=right | 3.7 km || 
|-id=464 bgcolor=#E9E9E9
| 212464 ||  || — || August 19, 2006 || Kitt Peak || Spacewatch || — || align=right | 2.7 km || 
|-id=465 bgcolor=#E9E9E9
| 212465 Goroshky ||  ||  || August 23, 2006 || Andrushivka || Andrushivka Obs. || — || align=right | 3.3 km || 
|-id=466 bgcolor=#d6d6d6
| 212466 ||  || — || August 17, 2006 || Palomar || NEAT || EOS || align=right | 2.8 km || 
|-id=467 bgcolor=#d6d6d6
| 212467 ||  || — || August 17, 2006 || Palomar || NEAT || KOR || align=right | 2.1 km || 
|-id=468 bgcolor=#d6d6d6
| 212468 ||  || — || August 18, 2006 || Kitt Peak || Spacewatch || EOS || align=right | 4.8 km || 
|-id=469 bgcolor=#E9E9E9
| 212469 ||  || — || August 19, 2006 || Anderson Mesa || LONEOS || WIT || align=right | 1.6 km || 
|-id=470 bgcolor=#fefefe
| 212470 ||  || — || August 19, 2006 || Anderson Mesa || LONEOS || NYS || align=right data-sort-value="0.96" | 960 m || 
|-id=471 bgcolor=#d6d6d6
| 212471 ||  || — || August 20, 2006 || Palomar || NEAT || — || align=right | 4.7 km || 
|-id=472 bgcolor=#fefefe
| 212472 ||  || — || August 20, 2006 || Palomar || NEAT || — || align=right | 1.3 km || 
|-id=473 bgcolor=#E9E9E9
| 212473 ||  || — || August 23, 2006 || Palomar || NEAT || — || align=right | 3.3 km || 
|-id=474 bgcolor=#E9E9E9
| 212474 ||  || — || August 16, 2006 || Siding Spring || SSS || — || align=right | 2.5 km || 
|-id=475 bgcolor=#fefefe
| 212475 ||  || — || August 22, 2006 || Palomar || NEAT || NYS || align=right | 1.1 km || 
|-id=476 bgcolor=#E9E9E9
| 212476 ||  || — || August 27, 2006 || Kitt Peak || Spacewatch || — || align=right | 2.8 km || 
|-id=477 bgcolor=#d6d6d6
| 212477 ||  || — || August 21, 2006 || Kitt Peak || Spacewatch || HYG || align=right | 3.2 km || 
|-id=478 bgcolor=#E9E9E9
| 212478 ||  || — || August 21, 2006 || Kitt Peak || Spacewatch || HOF || align=right | 4.0 km || 
|-id=479 bgcolor=#E9E9E9
| 212479 ||  || — || August 23, 2006 || Socorro || LINEAR || — || align=right | 2.1 km || 
|-id=480 bgcolor=#d6d6d6
| 212480 ||  || — || August 23, 2006 || Palomar || NEAT || — || align=right | 3.4 km || 
|-id=481 bgcolor=#E9E9E9
| 212481 ||  || — || August 24, 2006 || Palomar || NEAT || — || align=right | 2.1 km || 
|-id=482 bgcolor=#E9E9E9
| 212482 ||  || — || August 24, 2006 || Palomar || NEAT || — || align=right | 3.8 km || 
|-id=483 bgcolor=#E9E9E9
| 212483 ||  || — || August 25, 2006 || Pises || Pises Obs. || MRX || align=right | 1.3 km || 
|-id=484 bgcolor=#fefefe
| 212484 ||  || — || August 16, 2006 || Palomar || NEAT || V || align=right data-sort-value="0.90" | 900 m || 
|-id=485 bgcolor=#fefefe
| 212485 ||  || — || August 16, 2006 || Palomar || NEAT || FLO || align=right data-sort-value="0.94" | 940 m || 
|-id=486 bgcolor=#d6d6d6
| 212486 ||  || — || August 24, 2006 || Socorro || LINEAR || EOS || align=right | 3.1 km || 
|-id=487 bgcolor=#E9E9E9
| 212487 ||  || — || August 24, 2006 || Palomar || NEAT || GEF || align=right | 1.7 km || 
|-id=488 bgcolor=#E9E9E9
| 212488 ||  || — || August 27, 2006 || Kitt Peak || Spacewatch || — || align=right | 1.1 km || 
|-id=489 bgcolor=#fefefe
| 212489 ||  || — || August 24, 2006 || Socorro || LINEAR || — || align=right | 1.4 km || 
|-id=490 bgcolor=#d6d6d6
| 212490 ||  || — || August 27, 2006 || Anderson Mesa || LONEOS || SHU3:2 || align=right | 7.4 km || 
|-id=491 bgcolor=#d6d6d6
| 212491 ||  || — || August 27, 2006 || Anderson Mesa || LONEOS || — || align=right | 3.0 km || 
|-id=492 bgcolor=#fefefe
| 212492 ||  || — || August 29, 2006 || Catalina || CSS || — || align=right | 1.4 km || 
|-id=493 bgcolor=#d6d6d6
| 212493 ||  || — || August 17, 2006 || Palomar || NEAT || KOR || align=right | 1.7 km || 
|-id=494 bgcolor=#E9E9E9
| 212494 ||  || — || August 17, 2006 || Palomar || NEAT || — || align=right | 3.1 km || 
|-id=495 bgcolor=#E9E9E9
| 212495 ||  || — || August 18, 2006 || Palomar || NEAT || — || align=right | 2.4 km || 
|-id=496 bgcolor=#E9E9E9
| 212496 ||  || — || August 29, 2006 || Catalina || CSS || WIT || align=right | 1.6 km || 
|-id=497 bgcolor=#E9E9E9
| 212497 ||  || — || August 18, 2006 || Palomar || NEAT || PAD || align=right | 3.1 km || 
|-id=498 bgcolor=#E9E9E9
| 212498 ||  || — || August 29, 2006 || Catalina || CSS || — || align=right | 3.0 km || 
|-id=499 bgcolor=#E9E9E9
| 212499 ||  || — || August 30, 2006 || Anderson Mesa || LONEOS || AGN || align=right | 1.6 km || 
|-id=500 bgcolor=#E9E9E9
| 212500 Robertojoppolo || 2006 RT ||  || September 4, 2006 || Vallemare di Borbona || V. S. Casulli || — || align=right | 3.1 km || 
|}

212501–212600 

|-bgcolor=#E9E9E9
| 212501 ||  || — || September 14, 2006 || Catalina || CSS || — || align=right | 2.2 km || 
|-id=502 bgcolor=#E9E9E9
| 212502 ||  || — || September 14, 2006 || Catalina || CSS || — || align=right | 3.7 km || 
|-id=503 bgcolor=#E9E9E9
| 212503 ||  || — || September 12, 2006 || Catalina || CSS || — || align=right | 2.8 km || 
|-id=504 bgcolor=#E9E9E9
| 212504 ||  || — || September 12, 2006 || Catalina || CSS || AGN || align=right | 1.7 km || 
|-id=505 bgcolor=#E9E9E9
| 212505 ||  || — || September 14, 2006 || Catalina || CSS || — || align=right | 2.1 km || 
|-id=506 bgcolor=#E9E9E9
| 212506 ||  || — || September 14, 2006 || Catalina || CSS || — || align=right | 2.4 km || 
|-id=507 bgcolor=#d6d6d6
| 212507 ||  || — || September 14, 2006 || Palomar || NEAT || — || align=right | 5.3 km || 
|-id=508 bgcolor=#E9E9E9
| 212508 ||  || — || September 14, 2006 || Palomar || NEAT || — || align=right | 1.8 km || 
|-id=509 bgcolor=#E9E9E9
| 212509 ||  || — || September 15, 2006 || Kitt Peak || Spacewatch || — || align=right | 2.1 km || 
|-id=510 bgcolor=#fefefe
| 212510 ||  || — || September 15, 2006 || 7300 Observatory || W. K. Y. Yeung || FLO || align=right data-sort-value="0.84" | 840 m || 
|-id=511 bgcolor=#E9E9E9
| 212511 ||  || — || September 14, 2006 || Catalina || CSS || — || align=right | 1.3 km || 
|-id=512 bgcolor=#E9E9E9
| 212512 ||  || — || September 14, 2006 || Catalina || CSS || — || align=right | 2.2 km || 
|-id=513 bgcolor=#d6d6d6
| 212513 ||  || — || September 15, 2006 || Socorro || LINEAR || EOS || align=right | 3.3 km || 
|-id=514 bgcolor=#fefefe
| 212514 ||  || — || September 15, 2006 || Palomar || NEAT || — || align=right | 1.6 km || 
|-id=515 bgcolor=#E9E9E9
| 212515 ||  || — || September 12, 2006 || Catalina || CSS || WIT || align=right | 1.7 km || 
|-id=516 bgcolor=#d6d6d6
| 212516 ||  || — || September 12, 2006 || Catalina || CSS || — || align=right | 4.6 km || 
|-id=517 bgcolor=#d6d6d6
| 212517 ||  || — || September 14, 2006 || Catalina || CSS || — || align=right | 4.9 km || 
|-id=518 bgcolor=#d6d6d6
| 212518 ||  || — || September 15, 2006 || Palomar || NEAT || — || align=right | 3.8 km || 
|-id=519 bgcolor=#d6d6d6
| 212519 ||  || — || September 12, 2006 || Catalina || CSS || — || align=right | 4.8 km || 
|-id=520 bgcolor=#d6d6d6
| 212520 ||  || — || September 14, 2006 || Kitt Peak || Spacewatch || KOR || align=right | 1.8 km || 
|-id=521 bgcolor=#E9E9E9
| 212521 ||  || — || September 14, 2006 || Kitt Peak || Spacewatch || GEF || align=right | 1.9 km || 
|-id=522 bgcolor=#E9E9E9
| 212522 ||  || — || September 14, 2006 || Kitt Peak || Spacewatch || HOF || align=right | 4.1 km || 
|-id=523 bgcolor=#E9E9E9
| 212523 ||  || — || September 14, 2006 || Kitt Peak || Spacewatch || AST || align=right | 3.4 km || 
|-id=524 bgcolor=#d6d6d6
| 212524 ||  || — || September 15, 2006 || Kitt Peak || Spacewatch || — || align=right | 3.0 km || 
|-id=525 bgcolor=#d6d6d6
| 212525 ||  || — || September 12, 2006 || Catalina || CSS || KOR || align=right | 1.8 km || 
|-id=526 bgcolor=#d6d6d6
| 212526 ||  || — || September 15, 2006 || Kitt Peak || Spacewatch || — || align=right | 4.4 km || 
|-id=527 bgcolor=#d6d6d6
| 212527 ||  || — || September 15, 2006 || Kitt Peak || Spacewatch || — || align=right | 3.0 km || 
|-id=528 bgcolor=#d6d6d6
| 212528 ||  || — || September 15, 2006 || Kitt Peak || Spacewatch || KOR || align=right | 2.1 km || 
|-id=529 bgcolor=#d6d6d6
| 212529 ||  || — || September 15, 2006 || Kitt Peak || Spacewatch || — || align=right | 3.6 km || 
|-id=530 bgcolor=#d6d6d6
| 212530 ||  || — || September 15, 2006 || Kitt Peak || Spacewatch || THM || align=right | 2.8 km || 
|-id=531 bgcolor=#d6d6d6
| 212531 ||  || — || September 15, 2006 || Kitt Peak || Spacewatch || — || align=right | 3.3 km || 
|-id=532 bgcolor=#E9E9E9
| 212532 ||  || — || September 15, 2006 || Kitt Peak || Spacewatch || — || align=right | 1.7 km || 
|-id=533 bgcolor=#d6d6d6
| 212533 ||  || — || September 15, 2006 || Kitt Peak || Spacewatch || VER || align=right | 2.9 km || 
|-id=534 bgcolor=#d6d6d6
| 212534 ||  || — || September 15, 2006 || Kitt Peak || Spacewatch || — || align=right | 3.2 km || 
|-id=535 bgcolor=#E9E9E9
| 212535 ||  || — || September 15, 2006 || Kitt Peak || Spacewatch || — || align=right | 2.2 km || 
|-id=536 bgcolor=#d6d6d6
| 212536 ||  || — || September 15, 2006 || Kitt Peak || Spacewatch || HYG || align=right | 3.9 km || 
|-id=537 bgcolor=#d6d6d6
| 212537 ||  || — || September 15, 2006 || Kitt Peak || Spacewatch || — || align=right | 3.5 km || 
|-id=538 bgcolor=#d6d6d6
| 212538 ||  || — || September 15, 2006 || Kitt Peak || Spacewatch || CHA || align=right | 2.5 km || 
|-id=539 bgcolor=#E9E9E9
| 212539 ||  || — || September 15, 2006 || Kitt Peak || Spacewatch || — || align=right | 3.0 km || 
|-id=540 bgcolor=#E9E9E9
| 212540 ||  || — || September 12, 2006 || Catalina || CSS || — || align=right | 2.7 km || 
|-id=541 bgcolor=#E9E9E9
| 212541 ||  || — || September 15, 2006 || Kitt Peak || Spacewatch || DOR || align=right | 4.2 km || 
|-id=542 bgcolor=#E9E9E9
| 212542 ||  || — || September 16, 2006 || Catalina || CSS || — || align=right | 3.3 km || 
|-id=543 bgcolor=#E9E9E9
| 212543 ||  || — || September 16, 2006 || Catalina || CSS || — || align=right | 4.4 km || 
|-id=544 bgcolor=#d6d6d6
| 212544 ||  || — || September 16, 2006 || Catalina || CSS || — || align=right | 4.2 km || 
|-id=545 bgcolor=#E9E9E9
| 212545 ||  || — || September 16, 2006 || Socorro || LINEAR || RAF || align=right | 1.2 km || 
|-id=546 bgcolor=#FFC2E0
| 212546 ||  || — || September 19, 2006 || Catalina || CSS || AMO +1kmPHA || align=right | 1.0 km || 
|-id=547 bgcolor=#d6d6d6
| 212547 ||  || — || September 18, 2006 || Calvin-Rehoboth || Calvin–Rehoboth Obs. || — || align=right | 3.4 km || 
|-id=548 bgcolor=#E9E9E9
| 212548 ||  || — || September 18, 2006 || Anderson Mesa || LONEOS || — || align=right | 2.0 km || 
|-id=549 bgcolor=#d6d6d6
| 212549 ||  || — || September 18, 2006 || Catalina || CSS || — || align=right | 4.6 km || 
|-id=550 bgcolor=#d6d6d6
| 212550 ||  || — || September 16, 2006 || Anderson Mesa || LONEOS || HYG || align=right | 4.4 km || 
|-id=551 bgcolor=#E9E9E9
| 212551 ||  || — || September 17, 2006 || Kitt Peak || Spacewatch || — || align=right | 2.8 km || 
|-id=552 bgcolor=#d6d6d6
| 212552 ||  || — || September 17, 2006 || Kitt Peak || Spacewatch || — || align=right | 5.4 km || 
|-id=553 bgcolor=#E9E9E9
| 212553 ||  || — || September 18, 2006 || Kitt Peak || Spacewatch || — || align=right | 1.8 km || 
|-id=554 bgcolor=#d6d6d6
| 212554 ||  || — || September 18, 2006 || Kitt Peak || Spacewatch || — || align=right | 3.2 km || 
|-id=555 bgcolor=#E9E9E9
| 212555 ||  || — || September 19, 2006 || Catalina || CSS || — || align=right | 2.7 km || 
|-id=556 bgcolor=#E9E9E9
| 212556 ||  || — || September 19, 2006 || OAM || OAM Obs. || — || align=right | 2.4 km || 
|-id=557 bgcolor=#d6d6d6
| 212557 ||  || — || September 19, 2006 || OAM || OAM Obs. || URS || align=right | 6.3 km || 
|-id=558 bgcolor=#d6d6d6
| 212558 ||  || — || September 16, 2006 || Catalina || CSS || — || align=right | 5.0 km || 
|-id=559 bgcolor=#d6d6d6
| 212559 ||  || — || September 19, 2006 || Anderson Mesa || LONEOS || NAE || align=right | 3.8 km || 
|-id=560 bgcolor=#E9E9E9
| 212560 ||  || — || September 19, 2006 || Kitt Peak || Spacewatch || GEF || align=right | 1.6 km || 
|-id=561 bgcolor=#d6d6d6
| 212561 ||  || — || September 19, 2006 || Kitt Peak || Spacewatch || — || align=right | 5.6 km || 
|-id=562 bgcolor=#d6d6d6
| 212562 ||  || — || September 19, 2006 || Kitt Peak || Spacewatch || KAR || align=right | 1.4 km || 
|-id=563 bgcolor=#E9E9E9
| 212563 ||  || — || September 18, 2006 || Catalina || CSS || — || align=right | 3.4 km || 
|-id=564 bgcolor=#E9E9E9
| 212564 ||  || — || September 18, 2006 || Kitt Peak || Spacewatch || — || align=right | 1.8 km || 
|-id=565 bgcolor=#E9E9E9
| 212565 ||  || — || September 18, 2006 || Kitt Peak || Spacewatch || MRX || align=right | 1.5 km || 
|-id=566 bgcolor=#E9E9E9
| 212566 ||  || — || September 18, 2006 || Kitt Peak || Spacewatch || — || align=right | 2.8 km || 
|-id=567 bgcolor=#d6d6d6
| 212567 ||  || — || September 18, 2006 || Kitt Peak || Spacewatch || EOS || align=right | 2.1 km || 
|-id=568 bgcolor=#d6d6d6
| 212568 ||  || — || September 18, 2006 || Kitt Peak || Spacewatch || — || align=right | 3.3 km || 
|-id=569 bgcolor=#d6d6d6
| 212569 ||  || — || September 18, 2006 || Kitt Peak || Spacewatch || HYG || align=right | 4.0 km || 
|-id=570 bgcolor=#E9E9E9
| 212570 ||  || — || September 18, 2006 || Kitt Peak || Spacewatch || — || align=right | 1.8 km || 
|-id=571 bgcolor=#E9E9E9
| 212571 ||  || — || September 18, 2006 || Kitt Peak || Spacewatch || NEM || align=right | 3.0 km || 
|-id=572 bgcolor=#E9E9E9
| 212572 ||  || — || September 18, 2006 || Kitt Peak || Spacewatch || RAF || align=right | 1.4 km || 
|-id=573 bgcolor=#E9E9E9
| 212573 ||  || — || September 19, 2006 || Kitt Peak || Spacewatch || — || align=right | 1.9 km || 
|-id=574 bgcolor=#d6d6d6
| 212574 ||  || — || September 22, 2006 || Anderson Mesa || LONEOS || — || align=right | 5.9 km || 
|-id=575 bgcolor=#d6d6d6
| 212575 ||  || — || September 24, 2006 || Kitt Peak || Spacewatch || — || align=right | 3.0 km || 
|-id=576 bgcolor=#d6d6d6
| 212576 ||  || — || September 24, 2006 || Kitt Peak || Spacewatch || — || align=right | 5.6 km || 
|-id=577 bgcolor=#d6d6d6
| 212577 ||  || — || September 24, 2006 || Kitt Peak || Spacewatch || — || align=right | 2.5 km || 
|-id=578 bgcolor=#E9E9E9
| 212578 ||  || — || September 19, 2006 || Catalina || CSS || — || align=right | 3.4 km || 
|-id=579 bgcolor=#d6d6d6
| 212579 ||  || — || September 19, 2006 || Catalina || CSS || — || align=right | 4.6 km || 
|-id=580 bgcolor=#d6d6d6
| 212580 ||  || — || September 20, 2006 || Catalina || CSS || — || align=right | 4.9 km || 
|-id=581 bgcolor=#E9E9E9
| 212581 ||  || — || September 17, 2006 || Catalina || CSS || — || align=right | 2.6 km || 
|-id=582 bgcolor=#d6d6d6
| 212582 ||  || — || September 20, 2006 || Kitt Peak || Spacewatch || — || align=right | 3.9 km || 
|-id=583 bgcolor=#E9E9E9
| 212583 ||  || — || September 22, 2006 || Socorro || LINEAR || GER || align=right | 4.1 km || 
|-id=584 bgcolor=#E9E9E9
| 212584 ||  || — || September 19, 2006 || Kitt Peak || Spacewatch || — || align=right | 2.1 km || 
|-id=585 bgcolor=#d6d6d6
| 212585 ||  || — || September 23, 2006 || Kitt Peak || Spacewatch || — || align=right | 2.8 km || 
|-id=586 bgcolor=#d6d6d6
| 212586 ||  || — || September 23, 2006 || Kitt Peak || Spacewatch || KOR || align=right | 1.9 km || 
|-id=587 bgcolor=#E9E9E9
| 212587 Bartasiute ||  ||  || September 23, 2006 || Moletai || K. Černis, J. Zdanavičius || RAF || align=right | 1.6 km || 
|-id=588 bgcolor=#fefefe
| 212588 ||  || — || September 25, 2006 || Kitt Peak || Spacewatch || NYS || align=right data-sort-value="0.72" | 720 m || 
|-id=589 bgcolor=#d6d6d6
| 212589 ||  || — || September 25, 2006 || Socorro || LINEAR || — || align=right | 4.1 km || 
|-id=590 bgcolor=#d6d6d6
| 212590 ||  || — || September 25, 2006 || Kitt Peak || Spacewatch || — || align=right | 3.2 km || 
|-id=591 bgcolor=#d6d6d6
| 212591 ||  || — || September 26, 2006 || Mount Lemmon || Mount Lemmon Survey || — || align=right | 2.9 km || 
|-id=592 bgcolor=#d6d6d6
| 212592 ||  || — || September 26, 2006 || Kitt Peak || Spacewatch || — || align=right | 3.7 km || 
|-id=593 bgcolor=#d6d6d6
| 212593 ||  || — || September 25, 2006 || Mount Lemmon || Mount Lemmon Survey || — || align=right | 3.0 km || 
|-id=594 bgcolor=#d6d6d6
| 212594 ||  || — || September 26, 2006 || Socorro || LINEAR || EOS || align=right | 3.3 km || 
|-id=595 bgcolor=#E9E9E9
| 212595 ||  || — || September 26, 2006 || Kitt Peak || Spacewatch || — || align=right | 2.1 km || 
|-id=596 bgcolor=#E9E9E9
| 212596 ||  || — || September 27, 2006 || OAM || OAM Obs. || — || align=right | 1.4 km || 
|-id=597 bgcolor=#d6d6d6
| 212597 ||  || — || September 25, 2006 || Kitt Peak || Spacewatch || — || align=right | 4.9 km || 
|-id=598 bgcolor=#E9E9E9
| 212598 ||  || — || September 26, 2006 || Kitt Peak || Spacewatch || AEO || align=right | 2.0 km || 
|-id=599 bgcolor=#d6d6d6
| 212599 ||  || — || September 26, 2006 || Kitt Peak || Spacewatch || THM || align=right | 3.0 km || 
|-id=600 bgcolor=#d6d6d6
| 212600 ||  || — || September 26, 2006 || Mount Lemmon || Mount Lemmon Survey || — || align=right | 3.1 km || 
|}

212601–212700 

|-bgcolor=#d6d6d6
| 212601 ||  || — || September 27, 2006 || Mount Lemmon || Mount Lemmon Survey || — || align=right | 4.0 km || 
|-id=602 bgcolor=#d6d6d6
| 212602 ||  || — || September 27, 2006 || Kitt Peak || Spacewatch || — || align=right | 4.2 km || 
|-id=603 bgcolor=#E9E9E9
| 212603 ||  || — || September 28, 2006 || Kitt Peak || Spacewatch || — || align=right | 2.1 km || 
|-id=604 bgcolor=#E9E9E9
| 212604 ||  || — || September 28, 2006 || Kitt Peak || Spacewatch || — || align=right | 2.0 km || 
|-id=605 bgcolor=#d6d6d6
| 212605 ||  || — || September 16, 2006 || Catalina || CSS || — || align=right | 4.8 km || 
|-id=606 bgcolor=#E9E9E9
| 212606 Janulis ||  ||  || September 27, 2006 || Moletai || K. Černis, J. Zdanavičius || — || align=right | 2.7 km || 
|-id=607 bgcolor=#d6d6d6
| 212607 ||  || — || September 26, 2006 || Kitt Peak || Spacewatch || — || align=right | 3.2 km || 
|-id=608 bgcolor=#E9E9E9
| 212608 ||  || — || September 27, 2006 || Kitt Peak || Spacewatch || — || align=right | 1.4 km || 
|-id=609 bgcolor=#d6d6d6
| 212609 ||  || — || September 27, 2006 || Kitt Peak || Spacewatch || — || align=right | 4.0 km || 
|-id=610 bgcolor=#E9E9E9
| 212610 ||  || — || September 27, 2006 || Kitt Peak || Spacewatch || — || align=right | 2.3 km || 
|-id=611 bgcolor=#d6d6d6
| 212611 ||  || — || September 30, 2006 || Catalina || CSS || — || align=right | 4.4 km || 
|-id=612 bgcolor=#d6d6d6
| 212612 ||  || — || September 30, 2006 || Catalina || CSS || — || align=right | 4.9 km || 
|-id=613 bgcolor=#d6d6d6
| 212613 ||  || — || September 30, 2006 || Mount Lemmon || Mount Lemmon Survey || TEL || align=right | 2.0 km || 
|-id=614 bgcolor=#d6d6d6
| 212614 ||  || — || September 29, 2006 || Apache Point || A. C. Becker || EOS || align=right | 3.1 km || 
|-id=615 bgcolor=#E9E9E9
| 212615 ||  || — || September 30, 2006 || Kitt Peak || Spacewatch || — || align=right | 2.7 km || 
|-id=616 bgcolor=#d6d6d6
| 212616 ||  || — || September 16, 2006 || Kitt Peak || Spacewatch || — || align=right | 4.8 km || 
|-id=617 bgcolor=#E9E9E9
| 212617 ||  || — || September 17, 2006 || Kitt Peak || Spacewatch || — || align=right | 1.5 km || 
|-id=618 bgcolor=#d6d6d6
| 212618 ||  || — || September 19, 2006 || Kitt Peak || Spacewatch || CHA || align=right | 2.3 km || 
|-id=619 bgcolor=#d6d6d6
| 212619 ||  || — || October 11, 2006 || Kitt Peak || Spacewatch || — || align=right | 5.0 km || 
|-id=620 bgcolor=#d6d6d6
| 212620 ||  || — || October 11, 2006 || Kitt Peak || Spacewatch || — || align=right | 5.5 km || 
|-id=621 bgcolor=#E9E9E9
| 212621 ||  || — || October 11, 2006 || Kitt Peak || Spacewatch || — || align=right | 2.1 km || 
|-id=622 bgcolor=#d6d6d6
| 212622 ||  || — || October 11, 2006 || Kitt Peak || Spacewatch || — || align=right | 4.4 km || 
|-id=623 bgcolor=#d6d6d6
| 212623 ||  || — || October 11, 2006 || Kitt Peak || Spacewatch || — || align=right | 3.7 km || 
|-id=624 bgcolor=#d6d6d6
| 212624 ||  || — || October 12, 2006 || Kitt Peak || Spacewatch || HYG || align=right | 3.2 km || 
|-id=625 bgcolor=#d6d6d6
| 212625 ||  || — || October 12, 2006 || Kitt Peak || Spacewatch || — || align=right | 3.3 km || 
|-id=626 bgcolor=#d6d6d6
| 212626 ||  || — || October 12, 2006 || Kitt Peak || Spacewatch || — || align=right | 5.9 km || 
|-id=627 bgcolor=#d6d6d6
| 212627 ||  || — || October 12, 2006 || Kitt Peak || Spacewatch || THM || align=right | 3.2 km || 
|-id=628 bgcolor=#d6d6d6
| 212628 ||  || — || October 12, 2006 || Palomar || NEAT || — || align=right | 5.3 km || 
|-id=629 bgcolor=#E9E9E9
| 212629 ||  || — || October 12, 2006 || Palomar || NEAT || MIS || align=right | 1.5 km || 
|-id=630 bgcolor=#d6d6d6
| 212630 ||  || — || October 12, 2006 || Palomar || NEAT || HYG || align=right | 5.7 km || 
|-id=631 bgcolor=#d6d6d6
| 212631 Hsinchu ||  ||  || October 14, 2006 || Lulin Observatory || C.-S. Lin, Q.-z. Ye || — || align=right | 4.5 km || 
|-id=632 bgcolor=#E9E9E9
| 212632 ||  || — || October 15, 2006 || San Marcello || Pistoia Mountains Obs. || — || align=right | 4.2 km || 
|-id=633 bgcolor=#E9E9E9
| 212633 ||  || — || October 12, 2006 || Palomar || NEAT || — || align=right | 1.9 km || 
|-id=634 bgcolor=#d6d6d6
| 212634 ||  || — || October 15, 2006 || Kitt Peak || Spacewatch || — || align=right | 3.7 km || 
|-id=635 bgcolor=#d6d6d6
| 212635 ||  || — || October 15, 2006 || Kitt Peak || Spacewatch || — || align=right | 5.2 km || 
|-id=636 bgcolor=#d6d6d6
| 212636 ||  || — || October 4, 2006 || Mount Lemmon || Mount Lemmon Survey || — || align=right | 6.5 km || 
|-id=637 bgcolor=#d6d6d6
| 212637 ||  || — || October 12, 2006 || Palomar || NEAT || — || align=right | 4.6 km || 
|-id=638 bgcolor=#d6d6d6
| 212638 ||  || — || October 16, 2006 || Bergisch Gladbach || W. Bickel || — || align=right | 3.3 km || 
|-id=639 bgcolor=#d6d6d6
| 212639 ||  || — || October 16, 2006 || Kitt Peak || Spacewatch || — || align=right | 2.7 km || 
|-id=640 bgcolor=#d6d6d6
| 212640 ||  || — || October 16, 2006 || Kitt Peak || Spacewatch || — || align=right | 2.5 km || 
|-id=641 bgcolor=#d6d6d6
| 212641 ||  || — || October 16, 2006 || Kitt Peak || Spacewatch || — || align=right | 4.2 km || 
|-id=642 bgcolor=#d6d6d6
| 212642 ||  || — || October 16, 2006 || Kitt Peak || Spacewatch || THM || align=right | 3.2 km || 
|-id=643 bgcolor=#d6d6d6
| 212643 ||  || — || October 16, 2006 || Kitt Peak || Spacewatch || — || align=right | 3.8 km || 
|-id=644 bgcolor=#d6d6d6
| 212644 ||  || — || October 16, 2006 || Kitt Peak || Spacewatch || — || align=right | 3.9 km || 
|-id=645 bgcolor=#E9E9E9
| 212645 ||  || — || October 16, 2006 || Kitt Peak || Spacewatch || — || align=right | 2.7 km || 
|-id=646 bgcolor=#d6d6d6
| 212646 ||  || — || October 17, 2006 || Mount Lemmon || Mount Lemmon Survey || — || align=right | 2.5 km || 
|-id=647 bgcolor=#d6d6d6
| 212647 ||  || — || October 16, 2006 || Catalina || CSS || EOS || align=right | 2.5 km || 
|-id=648 bgcolor=#d6d6d6
| 212648 ||  || — || October 16, 2006 || Catalina || CSS || — || align=right | 4.9 km || 
|-id=649 bgcolor=#E9E9E9
| 212649 ||  || — || October 17, 2006 || Catalina || CSS || — || align=right | 3.7 km || 
|-id=650 bgcolor=#d6d6d6
| 212650 ||  || — || October 17, 2006 || Kitt Peak || Spacewatch || EOSfast? || align=right | 2.6 km || 
|-id=651 bgcolor=#d6d6d6
| 212651 ||  || — || October 18, 2006 || Kitt Peak || Spacewatch || HYG || align=right | 4.3 km || 
|-id=652 bgcolor=#E9E9E9
| 212652 ||  || — || October 19, 2006 || Catalina || CSS || — || align=right | 1.3 km || 
|-id=653 bgcolor=#d6d6d6
| 212653 ||  || — || October 19, 2006 || Catalina || CSS || — || align=right | 5.1 km || 
|-id=654 bgcolor=#d6d6d6
| 212654 ||  || — || October 19, 2006 || Kitt Peak || Spacewatch || EOS || align=right | 1.9 km || 
|-id=655 bgcolor=#d6d6d6
| 212655 ||  || — || October 19, 2006 || Kitt Peak || Spacewatch || — || align=right | 3.6 km || 
|-id=656 bgcolor=#E9E9E9
| 212656 ||  || — || October 21, 2006 || Mount Lemmon || Mount Lemmon Survey || — || align=right | 2.0 km || 
|-id=657 bgcolor=#fefefe
| 212657 ||  || — || October 22, 2006 || Kitt Peak || Spacewatch || — || align=right data-sort-value="0.77" | 770 m || 
|-id=658 bgcolor=#d6d6d6
| 212658 ||  || — || October 16, 2006 || Catalina || CSS || — || align=right | 4.7 km || 
|-id=659 bgcolor=#fefefe
| 212659 ||  || — || October 20, 2006 || Kitt Peak || Spacewatch || — || align=right data-sort-value="0.75" | 750 m || 
|-id=660 bgcolor=#E9E9E9
| 212660 ||  || — || October 20, 2006 || Mount Lemmon || Mount Lemmon Survey || — || align=right | 2.8 km || 
|-id=661 bgcolor=#d6d6d6
| 212661 ||  || — || October 23, 2006 || Kitt Peak || Spacewatch || — || align=right | 3.4 km || 
|-id=662 bgcolor=#d6d6d6
| 212662 ||  || — || October 16, 2006 || Catalina || CSS || — || align=right | 3.6 km || 
|-id=663 bgcolor=#d6d6d6
| 212663 ||  || — || October 21, 2006 || Palomar || NEAT || — || align=right | 3.5 km || 
|-id=664 bgcolor=#d6d6d6
| 212664 ||  || — || October 21, 2006 || Palomar || NEAT || — || align=right | 4.5 km || 
|-id=665 bgcolor=#d6d6d6
| 212665 ||  || — || October 23, 2006 || Kitt Peak || Spacewatch || — || align=right | 4.6 km || 
|-id=666 bgcolor=#d6d6d6
| 212666 ||  || — || October 27, 2006 || Mount Lemmon || Mount Lemmon Survey || — || align=right | 3.6 km || 
|-id=667 bgcolor=#d6d6d6
| 212667 ||  || — || October 27, 2006 || Mount Lemmon || Mount Lemmon Survey || THM || align=right | 3.1 km || 
|-id=668 bgcolor=#d6d6d6
| 212668 ||  || — || October 28, 2006 || Kitt Peak || Spacewatch || KOR || align=right | 1.8 km || 
|-id=669 bgcolor=#d6d6d6
| 212669 ||  || — || October 28, 2006 || Kitt Peak || Spacewatch || 7:4 || align=right | 7.3 km || 
|-id=670 bgcolor=#d6d6d6
| 212670 ||  || — || October 16, 2006 || Kitt Peak || Spacewatch || KOR || align=right | 2.0 km || 
|-id=671 bgcolor=#d6d6d6
| 212671 ||  || — || October 19, 2006 || Mount Lemmon || Mount Lemmon Survey || NAE || align=right | 4.7 km || 
|-id=672 bgcolor=#d6d6d6
| 212672 ||  || — || October 21, 2006 || Apache Point || A. C. Becker || EOS || align=right | 2.5 km || 
|-id=673 bgcolor=#d6d6d6
| 212673 ||  || — || October 22, 2006 || Apache Point || A. C. Becker || VER || align=right | 3.1 km || 
|-id=674 bgcolor=#d6d6d6
| 212674 ||  || — || November 1, 2006 || Mount Lemmon || Mount Lemmon Survey || — || align=right | 3.9 km || 
|-id=675 bgcolor=#d6d6d6
| 212675 ||  || — || November 9, 2006 || Kitt Peak || Spacewatch || — || align=right | 3.8 km || 
|-id=676 bgcolor=#E9E9E9
| 212676 ||  || — || November 10, 2006 || Kitt Peak || Spacewatch || MRX || align=right | 1.3 km || 
|-id=677 bgcolor=#d6d6d6
| 212677 ||  || — || November 9, 2006 || Altschwendt || W. Ries || — || align=right | 4.8 km || 
|-id=678 bgcolor=#d6d6d6
| 212678 ||  || — || November 11, 2006 || Kitt Peak || Spacewatch || — || align=right | 3.8 km || 
|-id=679 bgcolor=#d6d6d6
| 212679 ||  || — || November 11, 2006 || Kitt Peak || Spacewatch || — || align=right | 5.3 km || 
|-id=680 bgcolor=#E9E9E9
| 212680 ||  || — || November 11, 2006 || Kitt Peak || Spacewatch || — || align=right | 2.7 km || 
|-id=681 bgcolor=#d6d6d6
| 212681 ||  || — || November 11, 2006 || Mount Lemmon || Mount Lemmon Survey || — || align=right | 3.6 km || 
|-id=682 bgcolor=#fefefe
| 212682 ||  || — || November 13, 2006 || Catalina || CSS || — || align=right | 1.3 km || 
|-id=683 bgcolor=#fefefe
| 212683 ||  || — || November 11, 2006 || Kitt Peak || Spacewatch || — || align=right | 1.1 km || 
|-id=684 bgcolor=#d6d6d6
| 212684 ||  || — || November 17, 2006 || Socorro || LINEAR || — || align=right | 3.8 km || 
|-id=685 bgcolor=#E9E9E9
| 212685 ||  || — || November 18, 2006 || Kitt Peak || Spacewatch || GEF || align=right | 1.8 km || 
|-id=686 bgcolor=#d6d6d6
| 212686 ||  || — || November 18, 2006 || Kitt Peak || Spacewatch || — || align=right | 4.9 km || 
|-id=687 bgcolor=#d6d6d6
| 212687 ||  || — || November 18, 2006 || Kitt Peak || Spacewatch || — || align=right | 3.1 km || 
|-id=688 bgcolor=#fefefe
| 212688 ||  || — || November 19, 2006 || Catalina || CSS || — || align=right data-sort-value="0.95" | 950 m || 
|-id=689 bgcolor=#d6d6d6
| 212689 ||  || — || November 22, 2006 || Kitt Peak || Spacewatch || 3:2 || align=right | 4.5 km || 
|-id=690 bgcolor=#d6d6d6
| 212690 ||  || — || November 24, 2006 || Mount Lemmon || Mount Lemmon Survey || SHU3:2 || align=right | 7.5 km || 
|-id=691 bgcolor=#d6d6d6
| 212691 ||  || — || December 12, 2006 || Socorro || LINEAR || — || align=right | 4.0 km || 
|-id=692 bgcolor=#d6d6d6
| 212692 Lazauskaite ||  ||  || March 23, 2007 || Moletai || K. Černis, J. Zdanavičius || EOS || align=right | 2.9 km || 
|-id=693 bgcolor=#E9E9E9
| 212693 ||  || — || April 16, 2007 || Catalina || CSS || NEM || align=right | 5.1 km || 
|-id=694 bgcolor=#C2FFFF
| 212694 ||  || — || August 12, 2007 || XuYi || PMO NEO || L4 || align=right | 14 km || 
|-id=695 bgcolor=#fefefe
| 212695 ||  || — || August 14, 2007 || Siding Spring || SSS || H || align=right data-sort-value="0.91" | 910 m || 
|-id=696 bgcolor=#fefefe
| 212696 ||  || — || August 15, 2007 || OAM || OAM Obs. || NYS || align=right | 1.1 km || 
|-id=697 bgcolor=#fefefe
| 212697 ||  || — || August 10, 2007 || Kitt Peak || Spacewatch || FLO || align=right | 1.1 km || 
|-id=698 bgcolor=#fefefe
| 212698 ||  || — || August 13, 2007 || Socorro || LINEAR || V || align=right | 1.1 km || 
|-id=699 bgcolor=#fefefe
| 212699 ||  || — || August 23, 2007 || Dauban || Chante-Perdrix Obs. || FLO || align=right data-sort-value="0.89" | 890 m || 
|-id=700 bgcolor=#fefefe
| 212700 ||  || — || August 21, 2007 || Anderson Mesa || LONEOS || — || align=right | 1.1 km || 
|}

212701–212800 

|-bgcolor=#fefefe
| 212701 ||  || — || August 22, 2007 || Socorro || LINEAR || MAS || align=right | 1.1 km || 
|-id=702 bgcolor=#fefefe
| 212702 ||  || — || August 23, 2007 || Kitt Peak || Spacewatch || — || align=right data-sort-value="0.82" | 820 m || 
|-id=703 bgcolor=#fefefe
| 212703 ||  || — || September 2, 2007 || Catalina || CSS || — || align=right | 1.3 km || 
|-id=704 bgcolor=#fefefe
| 212704 ||  || — || September 8, 2007 || OAM || OAM Obs. || NYS || align=right | 1.1 km || 
|-id=705 bgcolor=#fefefe
| 212705 Friûl ||  ||  || September 12, 2007 || Remanzacco || Remanzacco Obs. || MAS || align=right data-sort-value="0.96" | 960 m || 
|-id=706 bgcolor=#fefefe
| 212706 ||  || — || September 12, 2007 || Goodricke-Pigott || R. A. Tucker || MAS || align=right data-sort-value="0.81" | 810 m || 
|-id=707 bgcolor=#fefefe
| 212707 ||  || — || September 13, 2007 || Mount Lemmon || Mount Lemmon Survey || H || align=right data-sort-value="0.87" | 870 m || 
|-id=708 bgcolor=#fefefe
| 212708 ||  || — || September 4, 2007 || Mount Lemmon || Mount Lemmon Survey || V || align=right data-sort-value="0.65" | 650 m || 
|-id=709 bgcolor=#d6d6d6
| 212709 ||  || — || September 8, 2007 || Catalina || CSS || — || align=right | 4.2 km || 
|-id=710 bgcolor=#fefefe
| 212710 ||  || — || September 9, 2007 || Kitt Peak || Spacewatch || H || align=right data-sort-value="0.73" | 730 m || 
|-id=711 bgcolor=#fefefe
| 212711 ||  || — || September 9, 2007 || Kitt Peak || Spacewatch || ERI || align=right | 2.3 km || 
|-id=712 bgcolor=#fefefe
| 212712 ||  || — || September 9, 2007 || Kitt Peak || Spacewatch || — || align=right | 1.3 km || 
|-id=713 bgcolor=#fefefe
| 212713 ||  || — || September 9, 2007 || Kitt Peak || Spacewatch || — || align=right data-sort-value="0.89" | 890 m || 
|-id=714 bgcolor=#E9E9E9
| 212714 ||  || — || September 9, 2007 || Anderson Mesa || LONEOS || — || align=right | 2.8 km || 
|-id=715 bgcolor=#fefefe
| 212715 ||  || — || September 10, 2007 || Mount Lemmon || Mount Lemmon Survey || — || align=right data-sort-value="0.98" | 980 m || 
|-id=716 bgcolor=#fefefe
| 212716 ||  || — || September 11, 2007 || Catalina || CSS || — || align=right | 1.1 km || 
|-id=717 bgcolor=#fefefe
| 212717 ||  || — || September 11, 2007 || Mount Lemmon || Mount Lemmon Survey || — || align=right | 1.4 km || 
|-id=718 bgcolor=#fefefe
| 212718 ||  || — || September 12, 2007 || Mount Lemmon || Mount Lemmon Survey || — || align=right | 1.1 km || 
|-id=719 bgcolor=#fefefe
| 212719 ||  || — || September 12, 2007 || Mount Lemmon || Mount Lemmon Survey || — || align=right data-sort-value="0.69" | 690 m || 
|-id=720 bgcolor=#E9E9E9
| 212720 ||  || — || September 12, 2007 || Mount Lemmon || Mount Lemmon Survey || — || align=right | 1.3 km || 
|-id=721 bgcolor=#fefefe
| 212721 ||  || — || September 12, 2007 || Anderson Mesa || LONEOS || V || align=right data-sort-value="0.90" | 900 m || 
|-id=722 bgcolor=#fefefe
| 212722 ||  || — || September 13, 2007 || Anderson Mesa || LONEOS || — || align=right | 1.2 km || 
|-id=723 bgcolor=#fefefe
| 212723 Klitschko ||  ||  || September 14, 2007 || Andrushivka || Andrushivka Obs. || — || align=right | 1.1 km || 
|-id=724 bgcolor=#fefefe
| 212724 ||  || — || September 14, 2007 || Socorro || LINEAR || V || align=right data-sort-value="0.93" | 930 m || 
|-id=725 bgcolor=#fefefe
| 212725 ||  || — || September 14, 2007 || Socorro || LINEAR || — || align=right | 1.1 km || 
|-id=726 bgcolor=#fefefe
| 212726 ||  || — || September 14, 2007 || Socorro || LINEAR || FLO || align=right data-sort-value="0.81" | 810 m || 
|-id=727 bgcolor=#fefefe
| 212727 ||  || — || September 13, 2007 || Mount Lemmon || Mount Lemmon Survey || FLO || align=right data-sort-value="0.87" | 870 m || 
|-id=728 bgcolor=#fefefe
| 212728 ||  || — || September 13, 2007 || Mount Lemmon || Mount Lemmon Survey || — || align=right | 1.1 km || 
|-id=729 bgcolor=#E9E9E9
| 212729 ||  || — || September 10, 2007 || Kitt Peak || Spacewatch || — || align=right data-sort-value="0.97" | 970 m || 
|-id=730 bgcolor=#fefefe
| 212730 ||  || — || September 13, 2007 || Kitt Peak || Spacewatch || — || align=right data-sort-value="0.94" | 940 m || 
|-id=731 bgcolor=#fefefe
| 212731 ||  || — || September 9, 2007 || Kitt Peak || Spacewatch || — || align=right | 1.1 km || 
|-id=732 bgcolor=#fefefe
| 212732 ||  || — || September 12, 2007 || Catalina || CSS || FLO || align=right data-sort-value="0.90" | 900 m || 
|-id=733 bgcolor=#fefefe
| 212733 ||  || — || September 12, 2007 || Anderson Mesa || LONEOS || — || align=right | 1.5 km || 
|-id=734 bgcolor=#fefefe
| 212734 ||  || — || September 12, 2007 || Mount Lemmon || Mount Lemmon Survey || — || align=right | 1.1 km || 
|-id=735 bgcolor=#fefefe
| 212735 ||  || — || September 15, 2007 || Socorro || LINEAR || FLO || align=right | 1.2 km || 
|-id=736 bgcolor=#fefefe
| 212736 ||  || — || September 15, 2007 || Socorro || LINEAR || NYS || align=right data-sort-value="0.96" | 960 m || 
|-id=737 bgcolor=#E9E9E9
| 212737 ||  || — || September 13, 2007 || Mount Lemmon || Mount Lemmon Survey || — || align=right | 2.4 km || 
|-id=738 bgcolor=#E9E9E9
| 212738 ||  || — || September 15, 2007 || Mount Lemmon || Mount Lemmon Survey || AGN || align=right | 1.7 km || 
|-id=739 bgcolor=#E9E9E9
| 212739 ||  || — || September 15, 2007 || Mount Lemmon || Mount Lemmon Survey || — || align=right | 1.4 km || 
|-id=740 bgcolor=#fefefe
| 212740 ||  || — || September 15, 2007 || Kitt Peak || Spacewatch || — || align=right | 1.2 km || 
|-id=741 bgcolor=#E9E9E9
| 212741 ||  || — || September 5, 2007 || Catalina || CSS || MAR || align=right | 1.3 km || 
|-id=742 bgcolor=#d6d6d6
| 212742 ||  || — || September 5, 2007 || Catalina || CSS || EUP || align=right | 5.5 km || 
|-id=743 bgcolor=#d6d6d6
| 212743 ||  || — || September 14, 2007 || Catalina || CSS || EUP || align=right | 5.2 km || 
|-id=744 bgcolor=#E9E9E9
| 212744 ||  || — || September 15, 2007 || Mount Lemmon || Mount Lemmon Survey || — || align=right | 1.1 km || 
|-id=745 bgcolor=#E9E9E9
| 212745 ||  || — || September 18, 2007 || Mount Lemmon || Mount Lemmon Survey || — || align=right | 1.3 km || 
|-id=746 bgcolor=#E9E9E9
| 212746 ||  || — || September 18, 2007 || Mount Lemmon || Mount Lemmon Survey || — || align=right | 1.3 km || 
|-id=747 bgcolor=#E9E9E9
| 212747 || 2007 TY || — || October 2, 2007 || Antares || ARO || — || align=right | 2.1 km || 
|-id=748 bgcolor=#FA8072
| 212748 ||  || — || October 4, 2007 || Kitt Peak || Spacewatch || — || align=right data-sort-value="0.91" | 910 m || 
|-id=749 bgcolor=#fefefe
| 212749 ||  || — || October 6, 2007 || 7300 Observatory || W. K. Y. Yeung || — || align=right | 1.3 km || 
|-id=750 bgcolor=#fefefe
| 212750 ||  || — || October 6, 2007 || OAM || OAM Obs. || V || align=right | 1.1 km || 
|-id=751 bgcolor=#E9E9E9
| 212751 ||  || — || October 6, 2007 || Socorro || LINEAR || — || align=right | 2.7 km || 
|-id=752 bgcolor=#E9E9E9
| 212752 ||  || — || October 6, 2007 || Socorro || LINEAR || — || align=right | 1.6 km || 
|-id=753 bgcolor=#fefefe
| 212753 ||  || — || October 6, 2007 || Socorro || LINEAR || — || align=right | 1.4 km || 
|-id=754 bgcolor=#E9E9E9
| 212754 ||  || — || October 6, 2007 || Socorro || LINEAR || — || align=right | 1.2 km || 
|-id=755 bgcolor=#fefefe
| 212755 ||  || — || October 6, 2007 || Socorro || LINEAR || — || align=right | 1.3 km || 
|-id=756 bgcolor=#fefefe
| 212756 ||  || — || October 7, 2007 || Calvin-Rehoboth || Calvin–Rehoboth Obs. || — || align=right data-sort-value="0.95" | 950 m || 
|-id=757 bgcolor=#fefefe
| 212757 ||  || — || October 6, 2007 || Socorro || LINEAR || — || align=right | 1.3 km || 
|-id=758 bgcolor=#fefefe
| 212758 ||  || — || October 4, 2007 || Kitt Peak || Spacewatch || — || align=right data-sort-value="0.87" | 870 m || 
|-id=759 bgcolor=#E9E9E9
| 212759 ||  || — || October 4, 2007 || Kitt Peak || Spacewatch || — || align=right | 1.1 km || 
|-id=760 bgcolor=#fefefe
| 212760 ||  || — || October 4, 2007 || Catalina || CSS || — || align=right data-sort-value="0.97" | 970 m || 
|-id=761 bgcolor=#E9E9E9
| 212761 ||  || — || October 6, 2007 || Kitt Peak || Spacewatch || GEF || align=right | 1.9 km || 
|-id=762 bgcolor=#E9E9E9
| 212762 ||  || — || October 6, 2007 || Kitt Peak || Spacewatch || AGN || align=right | 1.7 km || 
|-id=763 bgcolor=#E9E9E9
| 212763 ||  || — || October 7, 2007 || Kitt Peak || Spacewatch || — || align=right | 2.2 km || 
|-id=764 bgcolor=#d6d6d6
| 212764 ||  || — || October 4, 2007 || Kitt Peak || Spacewatch || — || align=right | 2.4 km || 
|-id=765 bgcolor=#fefefe
| 212765 ||  || — || October 7, 2007 || Mount Lemmon || Mount Lemmon Survey || — || align=right | 1.2 km || 
|-id=766 bgcolor=#d6d6d6
| 212766 ||  || — || October 8, 2007 || Pla D'Arguines || R. Ferrando || — || align=right | 3.4 km || 
|-id=767 bgcolor=#fefefe
| 212767 ||  || — || October 10, 2007 || Mount Lemmon || Mount Lemmon Survey || — || align=right | 1.2 km || 
|-id=768 bgcolor=#d6d6d6
| 212768 ||  || — || October 12, 2007 || Goodricke-Pigott || R. A. Tucker || HYG || align=right | 4.2 km || 
|-id=769 bgcolor=#fefefe
| 212769 ||  || — || October 5, 2007 || Kitt Peak || Spacewatch || — || align=right data-sort-value="0.97" | 970 m || 
|-id=770 bgcolor=#E9E9E9
| 212770 ||  || — || October 5, 2007 || Kitt Peak || Spacewatch || — || align=right | 2.1 km || 
|-id=771 bgcolor=#E9E9E9
| 212771 ||  || — || October 8, 2007 || Mount Lemmon || Mount Lemmon Survey || HOF || align=right | 2.9 km || 
|-id=772 bgcolor=#E9E9E9
| 212772 ||  || — || October 6, 2007 || Kitt Peak || Spacewatch || — || align=right | 2.7 km || 
|-id=773 bgcolor=#E9E9E9
| 212773 ||  || — || October 8, 2007 || Anderson Mesa || LONEOS || — || align=right | 2.2 km || 
|-id=774 bgcolor=#fefefe
| 212774 ||  || — || October 9, 2007 || Anderson Mesa || LONEOS || — || align=right | 1.6 km || 
|-id=775 bgcolor=#fefefe
| 212775 ||  || — || October 7, 2007 || Catalina || CSS || NYS || align=right | 1.0 km || 
|-id=776 bgcolor=#E9E9E9
| 212776 ||  || — || October 6, 2007 || Kitt Peak || Spacewatch || MIS || align=right | 3.6 km || 
|-id=777 bgcolor=#fefefe
| 212777 ||  || — || October 9, 2007 || Kitt Peak || Spacewatch || — || align=right | 1.2 km || 
|-id=778 bgcolor=#fefefe
| 212778 ||  || — || October 9, 2007 || Mount Lemmon || Mount Lemmon Survey || MAS || align=right data-sort-value="0.78" | 780 m || 
|-id=779 bgcolor=#fefefe
| 212779 ||  || — || October 15, 2007 || Dauban || Chante-Perdrix Obs. || — || align=right data-sort-value="0.77" | 770 m || 
|-id=780 bgcolor=#fefefe
| 212780 ||  || — || October 9, 2007 || Socorro || LINEAR || — || align=right | 1.0 km || 
|-id=781 bgcolor=#E9E9E9
| 212781 ||  || — || October 11, 2007 || Socorro || LINEAR || — || align=right | 2.9 km || 
|-id=782 bgcolor=#fefefe
| 212782 ||  || — || October 13, 2007 || Socorro || LINEAR || V || align=right data-sort-value="0.98" | 980 m || 
|-id=783 bgcolor=#d6d6d6
| 212783 ||  || — || October 8, 2007 || Mount Lemmon || Mount Lemmon Survey || ALA || align=right | 4.4 km || 
|-id=784 bgcolor=#fefefe
| 212784 ||  || — || October 7, 2007 || Kitt Peak || Spacewatch || FLO || align=right data-sort-value="0.81" | 810 m || 
|-id=785 bgcolor=#E9E9E9
| 212785 ||  || — || October 7, 2007 || Kitt Peak || Spacewatch || — || align=right | 1.0 km || 
|-id=786 bgcolor=#E9E9E9
| 212786 ||  || — || October 7, 2007 || Kitt Peak || Spacewatch || — || align=right | 2.2 km || 
|-id=787 bgcolor=#fefefe
| 212787 ||  || — || October 9, 2007 || Kitt Peak || Spacewatch || — || align=right data-sort-value="0.83" | 830 m || 
|-id=788 bgcolor=#fefefe
| 212788 ||  || — || October 9, 2007 || Kitt Peak || Spacewatch || MAS || align=right | 1.0 km || 
|-id=789 bgcolor=#fefefe
| 212789 ||  || — || October 8, 2007 || Catalina || CSS || V || align=right data-sort-value="0.83" | 830 m || 
|-id=790 bgcolor=#E9E9E9
| 212790 ||  || — || October 8, 2007 || Kitt Peak || Spacewatch || — || align=right | 1.9 km || 
|-id=791 bgcolor=#d6d6d6
| 212791 ||  || — || October 8, 2007 || Kitt Peak || Spacewatch || — || align=right | 3.3 km || 
|-id=792 bgcolor=#d6d6d6
| 212792 ||  || — || October 8, 2007 || Kitt Peak || Spacewatch || ALA || align=right | 3.3 km || 
|-id=793 bgcolor=#d6d6d6
| 212793 ||  || — || October 8, 2007 || Catalina || CSS || — || align=right | 6.0 km || 
|-id=794 bgcolor=#E9E9E9
| 212794 ||  || — || October 8, 2007 || Catalina || CSS || — || align=right | 2.4 km || 
|-id=795 bgcolor=#fefefe
| 212795 Fangjiancheng ||  ||  || October 9, 2007 || XuYi || PMO NEO || — || align=right | 1.00 km || 
|-id=796 bgcolor=#E9E9E9
| 212796 Guoyonghuai ||  ||  || October 9, 2007 || XuYi || PMO NEO || — || align=right | 2.5 km || 
|-id=797 bgcolor=#E9E9E9
| 212797 Lipei ||  ||  || October 9, 2007 || XuYi || PMO NEO || PAD || align=right | 2.3 km || 
|-id=798 bgcolor=#fefefe
| 212798 ||  || — || October 10, 2007 || Kitt Peak || Spacewatch || V || align=right data-sort-value="0.92" | 920 m || 
|-id=799 bgcolor=#d6d6d6
| 212799 ||  || — || October 11, 2007 || Catalina || CSS || EOS || align=right | 6.6 km || 
|-id=800 bgcolor=#E9E9E9
| 212800 ||  || — || October 8, 2007 || Mount Lemmon || Mount Lemmon Survey || — || align=right data-sort-value="0.98" | 980 m || 
|}

212801–212900 

|-bgcolor=#fefefe
| 212801 ||  || — || October 12, 2007 || Kitt Peak || Spacewatch || — || align=right data-sort-value="0.75" | 750 m || 
|-id=802 bgcolor=#E9E9E9
| 212802 ||  || — || October 12, 2007 || Kitt Peak || Spacewatch || — || align=right data-sort-value="0.98" | 980 m || 
|-id=803 bgcolor=#E9E9E9
| 212803 ||  || — || October 12, 2007 || Kitt Peak || Spacewatch || — || align=right | 2.3 km || 
|-id=804 bgcolor=#E9E9E9
| 212804 ||  || — || October 14, 2007 || Kitt Peak || Spacewatch || — || align=right | 2.0 km || 
|-id=805 bgcolor=#E9E9E9
| 212805 ||  || — || October 14, 2007 || Mount Lemmon || Mount Lemmon Survey || — || align=right | 1.6 km || 
|-id=806 bgcolor=#d6d6d6
| 212806 ||  || — || October 14, 2007 || Mount Lemmon || Mount Lemmon Survey || — || align=right | 2.7 km || 
|-id=807 bgcolor=#E9E9E9
| 212807 ||  || — || October 9, 2007 || Kitt Peak || Spacewatch || — || align=right | 2.7 km || 
|-id=808 bgcolor=#fefefe
| 212808 ||  || — || October 10, 2007 || Catalina || CSS || — || align=right | 1.4 km || 
|-id=809 bgcolor=#fefefe
| 212809 ||  || — || October 14, 2007 || Kitt Peak || Spacewatch || — || align=right | 1.1 km || 
|-id=810 bgcolor=#E9E9E9
| 212810 ||  || — || October 14, 2007 || Kitt Peak || Spacewatch || AGN || align=right | 1.7 km || 
|-id=811 bgcolor=#fefefe
| 212811 ||  || — || October 13, 2007 || Mount Lemmon || Mount Lemmon Survey || — || align=right data-sort-value="0.96" | 960 m || 
|-id=812 bgcolor=#d6d6d6
| 212812 ||  || — || October 15, 2007 || Catalina || CSS || — || align=right | 3.5 km || 
|-id=813 bgcolor=#E9E9E9
| 212813 ||  || — || October 15, 2007 || Catalina || CSS || — || align=right | 1.7 km || 
|-id=814 bgcolor=#fefefe
| 212814 ||  || — || October 15, 2007 || Kitt Peak || Spacewatch || — || align=right | 1.0 km || 
|-id=815 bgcolor=#E9E9E9
| 212815 ||  || — || October 13, 2007 || Kitt Peak || Spacewatch || — || align=right | 3.6 km || 
|-id=816 bgcolor=#E9E9E9
| 212816 ||  || — || October 7, 2007 || Anderson Mesa || LONEOS || HEN || align=right | 1.5 km || 
|-id=817 bgcolor=#d6d6d6
| 212817 ||  || — || October 16, 2007 || Bisei SG Center || BATTeRS || THM || align=right | 2.9 km || 
|-id=818 bgcolor=#E9E9E9
| 212818 ||  || — || October 16, 2007 || Bisei SG Center || BATTeRS || — || align=right | 1.8 km || 
|-id=819 bgcolor=#fefefe
| 212819 ||  || — || October 18, 2007 || RAS || A. Lowe || — || align=right | 1.1 km || 
|-id=820 bgcolor=#fefefe
| 212820 ||  || — || October 16, 2007 || Kitt Peak || Spacewatch || — || align=right | 2.1 km || 
|-id=821 bgcolor=#E9E9E9
| 212821 ||  || — || October 18, 2007 || Mount Lemmon || Mount Lemmon Survey || — || align=right | 1.3 km || 
|-id=822 bgcolor=#fefefe
| 212822 ||  || — || October 18, 2007 || Kitt Peak || Spacewatch || — || align=right data-sort-value="0.89" | 890 m || 
|-id=823 bgcolor=#E9E9E9
| 212823 ||  || — || October 18, 2007 || Mount Lemmon || Mount Lemmon Survey || HEN || align=right | 1.3 km || 
|-id=824 bgcolor=#fefefe
| 212824 ||  || — || October 16, 2007 || Kitt Peak || Spacewatch || — || align=right data-sort-value="0.90" | 900 m || 
|-id=825 bgcolor=#E9E9E9
| 212825 ||  || — || October 16, 2007 || Kitt Peak || Spacewatch || GEF || align=right | 1.6 km || 
|-id=826 bgcolor=#fefefe
| 212826 ||  || — || October 19, 2007 || Anderson Mesa || LONEOS || NYS || align=right | 1.1 km || 
|-id=827 bgcolor=#fefefe
| 212827 ||  || — || October 16, 2007 || Catalina || CSS || V || align=right | 1.1 km || 
|-id=828 bgcolor=#E9E9E9
| 212828 ||  || — || October 19, 2007 || Anderson Mesa || LONEOS || — || align=right | 3.1 km || 
|-id=829 bgcolor=#E9E9E9
| 212829 ||  || — || October 24, 2007 || Mount Lemmon || Mount Lemmon Survey || — || align=right | 2.3 km || 
|-id=830 bgcolor=#E9E9E9
| 212830 ||  || — || October 30, 2007 || Kitt Peak || Spacewatch || MIS || align=right | 4.1 km || 
|-id=831 bgcolor=#fefefe
| 212831 ||  || — || October 30, 2007 || Catalina || CSS || — || align=right data-sort-value="0.85" | 850 m || 
|-id=832 bgcolor=#E9E9E9
| 212832 ||  || — || October 30, 2007 || Kitt Peak || Spacewatch || — || align=right | 1.2 km || 
|-id=833 bgcolor=#E9E9E9
| 212833 ||  || — || October 30, 2007 || Mount Lemmon || Mount Lemmon Survey || — || align=right data-sort-value="0.82" | 820 m || 
|-id=834 bgcolor=#E9E9E9
| 212834 ||  || — || October 30, 2007 || Catalina || CSS || — || align=right | 2.4 km || 
|-id=835 bgcolor=#fefefe
| 212835 ||  || — || October 31, 2007 || Kitt Peak || Spacewatch || — || align=right | 1.3 km || 
|-id=836 bgcolor=#fefefe
| 212836 ||  || — || October 30, 2007 || Kitt Peak || Spacewatch || — || align=right | 1.3 km || 
|-id=837 bgcolor=#fefefe
| 212837 ||  || — || October 30, 2007 || Kitt Peak || Spacewatch || MAS || align=right data-sort-value="0.90" | 900 m || 
|-id=838 bgcolor=#d6d6d6
| 212838 ||  || — || October 30, 2007 || Kitt Peak || Spacewatch || — || align=right | 4.2 km || 
|-id=839 bgcolor=#d6d6d6
| 212839 ||  || — || October 30, 2007 || Kitt Peak || Spacewatch || KOR || align=right | 1.9 km || 
|-id=840 bgcolor=#d6d6d6
| 212840 ||  || — || October 30, 2007 || Mount Lemmon || Mount Lemmon Survey || THM || align=right | 2.5 km || 
|-id=841 bgcolor=#d6d6d6
| 212841 ||  || — || October 30, 2007 || Kitt Peak || Spacewatch || — || align=right | 2.5 km || 
|-id=842 bgcolor=#fefefe
| 212842 ||  || — || October 30, 2007 || Kitt Peak || Spacewatch || V || align=right data-sort-value="0.98" | 980 m || 
|-id=843 bgcolor=#E9E9E9
| 212843 ||  || — || October 30, 2007 || Mount Lemmon || Mount Lemmon Survey || — || align=right | 1.1 km || 
|-id=844 bgcolor=#E9E9E9
| 212844 ||  || — || October 30, 2007 || Kitt Peak || Spacewatch || — || align=right | 1.3 km || 
|-id=845 bgcolor=#fefefe
| 212845 ||  || — || November 2, 2007 || Socorro || LINEAR || — || align=right | 1.1 km || 
|-id=846 bgcolor=#E9E9E9
| 212846 ||  || — || November 3, 2007 || Junk Bond || D. Healy || HNS || align=right | 1.9 km || 
|-id=847 bgcolor=#E9E9E9
| 212847 ||  || — || November 1, 2007 || Mount Lemmon || Mount Lemmon Survey || — || align=right | 1.3 km || 
|-id=848 bgcolor=#d6d6d6
| 212848 ||  || — || November 3, 2007 || 7300 Observatory || W. K. Y. Yeung || HYG || align=right | 3.1 km || 
|-id=849 bgcolor=#E9E9E9
| 212849 ||  || — || November 2, 2007 || Mount Lemmon || Mount Lemmon Survey || — || align=right | 1.5 km || 
|-id=850 bgcolor=#d6d6d6
| 212850 ||  || — || November 1, 2007 || Kitt Peak || Spacewatch || — || align=right | 2.6 km || 
|-id=851 bgcolor=#E9E9E9
| 212851 ||  || — || November 1, 2007 || Kitt Peak || Spacewatch || — || align=right | 2.3 km || 
|-id=852 bgcolor=#E9E9E9
| 212852 ||  || — || November 1, 2007 || Kitt Peak || Spacewatch || — || align=right | 2.1 km || 
|-id=853 bgcolor=#E9E9E9
| 212853 ||  || — || November 1, 2007 || Kitt Peak || Spacewatch || — || align=right | 3.0 km || 
|-id=854 bgcolor=#E9E9E9
| 212854 ||  || — || November 1, 2007 || Kitt Peak || Spacewatch || — || align=right | 1.2 km || 
|-id=855 bgcolor=#E9E9E9
| 212855 ||  || — || November 1, 2007 || Kitt Peak || Spacewatch || — || align=right | 2.5 km || 
|-id=856 bgcolor=#fefefe
| 212856 ||  || — || November 3, 2007 || Kitt Peak || Spacewatch || NYS || align=right data-sort-value="0.82" | 820 m || 
|-id=857 bgcolor=#E9E9E9
| 212857 ||  || — || November 5, 2007 || Catalina || CSS || — || align=right | 2.5 km || 
|-id=858 bgcolor=#fefefe
| 212858 ||  || — || November 2, 2007 || Socorro || LINEAR || V || align=right data-sort-value="0.92" | 920 m || 
|-id=859 bgcolor=#E9E9E9
| 212859 ||  || — || November 7, 2007 || Bisei SG Center || BATTeRS || — || align=right | 1.5 km || 
|-id=860 bgcolor=#E9E9E9
| 212860 ||  || — || November 3, 2007 || Kitt Peak || Spacewatch || — || align=right | 2.2 km || 
|-id=861 bgcolor=#E9E9E9
| 212861 ||  || — || November 3, 2007 || Kitt Peak || Spacewatch || — || align=right | 1.9 km || 
|-id=862 bgcolor=#fefefe
| 212862 ||  || — || November 3, 2007 || Kitt Peak || Spacewatch || — || align=right data-sort-value="0.85" | 850 m || 
|-id=863 bgcolor=#fefefe
| 212863 ||  || — || November 3, 2007 || Kitt Peak || Spacewatch || — || align=right | 1.2 km || 
|-id=864 bgcolor=#E9E9E9
| 212864 ||  || — || November 3, 2007 || Kitt Peak || Spacewatch || — || align=right | 3.0 km || 
|-id=865 bgcolor=#fefefe
| 212865 ||  || — || November 5, 2007 || Kitt Peak || Spacewatch || — || align=right | 1.4 km || 
|-id=866 bgcolor=#fefefe
| 212866 ||  || — || November 5, 2007 || Mount Lemmon || Mount Lemmon Survey || NYS || align=right data-sort-value="0.82" | 820 m || 
|-id=867 bgcolor=#fefefe
| 212867 ||  || — || November 1, 2007 || Mount Lemmon || Mount Lemmon Survey || — || align=right | 1.1 km || 
|-id=868 bgcolor=#E9E9E9
| 212868 ||  || — || November 4, 2007 || Kitt Peak || Spacewatch || — || align=right | 2.6 km || 
|-id=869 bgcolor=#E9E9E9
| 212869 ||  || — || November 2, 2007 || Kitt Peak || Spacewatch || HOF || align=right | 4.5 km || 
|-id=870 bgcolor=#E9E9E9
| 212870 ||  || — || November 5, 2007 || Mount Lemmon || Mount Lemmon Survey || HEN || align=right | 1.2 km || 
|-id=871 bgcolor=#d6d6d6
| 212871 ||  || — || November 5, 2007 || Kitt Peak || Spacewatch || — || align=right | 2.9 km || 
|-id=872 bgcolor=#E9E9E9
| 212872 ||  || — || November 2, 2007 || Catalina || CSS || — || align=right | 2.7 km || 
|-id=873 bgcolor=#E9E9E9
| 212873 ||  || — || November 6, 2007 || Marly || P. Kocher || PAD || align=right | 2.5 km || 
|-id=874 bgcolor=#d6d6d6
| 212874 ||  || — || November 12, 2007 || Bisei SG Center || BATTeRS || CHA || align=right | 2.7 km || 
|-id=875 bgcolor=#fefefe
| 212875 ||  || — || November 7, 2007 || Socorro || LINEAR || — || align=right data-sort-value="0.81" | 810 m || 
|-id=876 bgcolor=#E9E9E9
| 212876 ||  || — || November 9, 2007 || Kitt Peak || Spacewatch || HOF || align=right | 4.0 km || 
|-id=877 bgcolor=#E9E9E9
| 212877 ||  || — || November 7, 2007 || Kitt Peak || Spacewatch || — || align=right | 1.4 km || 
|-id=878 bgcolor=#fefefe
| 212878 ||  || — || November 7, 2007 || Kitt Peak || Spacewatch || — || align=right data-sort-value="0.77" | 770 m || 
|-id=879 bgcolor=#fefefe
| 212879 ||  || — || November 7, 2007 || Kitt Peak || Spacewatch || MAS || align=right | 1.3 km || 
|-id=880 bgcolor=#fefefe
| 212880 ||  || — || November 7, 2007 || Kitt Peak || Spacewatch || FLO || align=right | 1.2 km || 
|-id=881 bgcolor=#d6d6d6
| 212881 ||  || — || November 9, 2007 || Kitt Peak || Spacewatch || — || align=right | 3.8 km || 
|-id=882 bgcolor=#d6d6d6
| 212882 ||  || — || November 13, 2007 || Kitt Peak || Spacewatch || — || align=right | 3.1 km || 
|-id=883 bgcolor=#fefefe
| 212883 ||  || — || November 12, 2007 || Catalina || CSS || — || align=right | 1.2 km || 
|-id=884 bgcolor=#E9E9E9
| 212884 ||  || — || November 12, 2007 || Mount Lemmon || Mount Lemmon Survey || AGN || align=right | 1.8 km || 
|-id=885 bgcolor=#d6d6d6
| 212885 ||  || — || November 14, 2007 || Anderson Mesa || LONEOS || — || align=right | 4.0 km || 
|-id=886 bgcolor=#fefefe
| 212886 ||  || — || November 15, 2007 || Socorro || LINEAR || — || align=right | 1.2 km || 
|-id=887 bgcolor=#E9E9E9
| 212887 ||  || — || November 11, 2007 || Catalina || CSS || HNS || align=right | 1.6 km || 
|-id=888 bgcolor=#d6d6d6
| 212888 ||  || — || November 14, 2007 || Kitt Peak || Spacewatch || — || align=right | 3.7 km || 
|-id=889 bgcolor=#E9E9E9
| 212889 ||  || — || November 14, 2007 || Kitt Peak || Spacewatch || — || align=right | 2.1 km || 
|-id=890 bgcolor=#fefefe
| 212890 ||  || — || November 15, 2007 || Anderson Mesa || LONEOS || V || align=right data-sort-value="0.95" | 950 m || 
|-id=891 bgcolor=#E9E9E9
| 212891 ||  || — || November 14, 2007 || Kitt Peak || Spacewatch || — || align=right | 3.0 km || 
|-id=892 bgcolor=#d6d6d6
| 212892 ||  || — || November 14, 2007 || Kitt Peak || Spacewatch || — || align=right | 2.7 km || 
|-id=893 bgcolor=#d6d6d6
| 212893 ||  || — || November 15, 2007 || Catalina || CSS || VER || align=right | 3.1 km || 
|-id=894 bgcolor=#d6d6d6
| 212894 ||  || — || November 2, 2007 || Kitt Peak || Spacewatch || — || align=right | 3.4 km || 
|-id=895 bgcolor=#E9E9E9
| 212895 ||  || — || November 2, 2007 || Kitt Peak || Spacewatch || — || align=right | 1.3 km || 
|-id=896 bgcolor=#d6d6d6
| 212896 || 2007 WR || — || November 17, 2007 || La Cañada || J. Lacruz || KAR || align=right | 1.8 km || 
|-id=897 bgcolor=#fefefe
| 212897 ||  || — || November 18, 2007 || Socorro || LINEAR || — || align=right | 1.0 km || 
|-id=898 bgcolor=#E9E9E9
| 212898 ||  || — || November 17, 2007 || Socorro || LINEAR || — || align=right | 2.8 km || 
|-id=899 bgcolor=#E9E9E9
| 212899 ||  || — || November 17, 2007 || Catalina || CSS || — || align=right | 2.2 km || 
|-id=900 bgcolor=#d6d6d6
| 212900 ||  || — || November 18, 2007 || Mount Lemmon || Mount Lemmon Survey || KOR || align=right | 1.8 km || 
|}

212901–213000 

|-bgcolor=#fefefe
| 212901 ||  || — || November 18, 2007 || Mount Lemmon || Mount Lemmon Survey || — || align=right data-sort-value="0.92" | 920 m || 
|-id=902 bgcolor=#E9E9E9
| 212902 ||  || — || November 19, 2007 || Mount Lemmon || Mount Lemmon Survey || — || align=right | 4.0 km || 
|-id=903 bgcolor=#d6d6d6
| 212903 ||  || — || November 19, 2007 || Kitt Peak || Spacewatch || HYG || align=right | 3.4 km || 
|-id=904 bgcolor=#d6d6d6
| 212904 ||  || — || December 3, 2007 || Catalina || CSS || — || align=right | 5.0 km || 
|-id=905 bgcolor=#d6d6d6
| 212905 ||  || — || December 3, 2007 || Catalina || CSS || THM || align=right | 2.7 km || 
|-id=906 bgcolor=#E9E9E9
| 212906 ||  || — || December 4, 2007 || Catalina || CSS || — || align=right | 1.5 km || 
|-id=907 bgcolor=#d6d6d6
| 212907 ||  || — || December 4, 2007 || Catalina || CSS || — || align=right | 5.2 km || 
|-id=908 bgcolor=#d6d6d6
| 212908 ||  || — || December 4, 2007 || Mount Lemmon || Mount Lemmon Survey || — || align=right | 3.1 km || 
|-id=909 bgcolor=#E9E9E9
| 212909 ||  || — || December 8, 2007 || Bisei SG Center || BATTeRS || — || align=right | 2.3 km || 
|-id=910 bgcolor=#E9E9E9
| 212910 ||  || — || December 10, 2007 || Socorro || LINEAR || — || align=right | 3.1 km || 
|-id=911 bgcolor=#d6d6d6
| 212911 ||  || — || December 10, 2007 || Socorro || LINEAR || — || align=right | 3.0 km || 
|-id=912 bgcolor=#E9E9E9
| 212912 ||  || — || December 13, 2007 || Socorro || LINEAR || — || align=right | 2.1 km || 
|-id=913 bgcolor=#E9E9E9
| 212913 ||  || — || December 13, 2007 || Socorro || LINEAR || — || align=right | 1.7 km || 
|-id=914 bgcolor=#d6d6d6
| 212914 ||  || — || December 15, 2007 || Kitt Peak || Spacewatch || — || align=right | 3.6 km || 
|-id=915 bgcolor=#d6d6d6
| 212915 ||  || — || December 15, 2007 || Kitt Peak || Spacewatch || KOR || align=right | 2.2 km || 
|-id=916 bgcolor=#d6d6d6
| 212916 ||  || — || December 11, 2007 || Cerro Burek || Alianza S4 Obs. || — || align=right | 4.3 km || 
|-id=917 bgcolor=#d6d6d6
| 212917 || 2007 YR || — || December 16, 2007 || Bergisch Gladbach || W. Bickel || — || align=right | 3.1 km || 
|-id=918 bgcolor=#fefefe
| 212918 ||  || — || December 16, 2007 || Kitt Peak || Spacewatch || FLO || align=right data-sort-value="0.89" | 890 m || 
|-id=919 bgcolor=#d6d6d6
| 212919 ||  || — || December 17, 2007 || Mount Lemmon || Mount Lemmon Survey || — || align=right | 5.4 km || 
|-id=920 bgcolor=#E9E9E9
| 212920 ||  || — || December 16, 2007 || Kitt Peak || Spacewatch || — || align=right | 2.2 km || 
|-id=921 bgcolor=#d6d6d6
| 212921 ||  || — || December 16, 2007 || Mount Lemmon || Mount Lemmon Survey || — || align=right | 4.7 km || 
|-id=922 bgcolor=#d6d6d6
| 212922 ||  || — || December 28, 2007 || Kitt Peak || Spacewatch || — || align=right | 3.9 km || 
|-id=923 bgcolor=#E9E9E9
| 212923 ||  || — || December 31, 2007 || Catalina || CSS || — || align=right | 2.3 km || 
|-id=924 bgcolor=#d6d6d6
| 212924 Yurishevchuk ||  ||  || January 6, 2008 || Zelenchukskaya Stn || Zelenchukskaya Stn. || EOS || align=right | 3.3 km || 
|-id=925 bgcolor=#d6d6d6
| 212925 ||  || — || January 10, 2008 || Calvin-Rehoboth || Calvin–Rehoboth Obs. || — || align=right | 3.7 km || 
|-id=926 bgcolor=#d6d6d6
| 212926 ||  || — || January 10, 2008 || Catalina || CSS || VER || align=right | 4.3 km || 
|-id=927 bgcolor=#d6d6d6
| 212927 ||  || — || January 14, 2008 || Kitt Peak || Spacewatch || THM || align=right | 3.5 km || 
|-id=928 bgcolor=#d6d6d6
| 212928 ||  || — || January 15, 2008 || Mount Lemmon || Mount Lemmon Survey || 3:2 || align=right | 4.3 km || 
|-id=929 bgcolor=#E9E9E9
| 212929 Satovski ||  ||  || January 15, 2008 || Zelenchukskaya Stn || Zelenchukskaya Stn. || — || align=right | 4.0 km || 
|-id=930 bgcolor=#d6d6d6
| 212930 ||  || — || January 16, 2008 || Kitt Peak || Spacewatch || HYG || align=right | 4.3 km || 
|-id=931 bgcolor=#d6d6d6
| 212931 ||  || — || January 18, 2008 || Kitt Peak || Spacewatch || — || align=right | 4.3 km || 
|-id=932 bgcolor=#d6d6d6
| 212932 ||  || — || February 3, 2008 || Catalina || CSS || YAK || align=right | 6.1 km || 
|-id=933 bgcolor=#d6d6d6
| 212933 ||  || — || February 25, 2008 || Mount Lemmon || Mount Lemmon Survey || THM || align=right | 3.0 km || 
|-id=934 bgcolor=#E9E9E9
| 212934 ||  || — || September 23, 2008 || Mount Lemmon || Mount Lemmon Survey || GER || align=right | 4.6 km || 
|-id=935 bgcolor=#d6d6d6
| 212935 ||  || — || October 24, 2008 || Socorro || LINEAR || EOS || align=right | 3.3 km || 
|-id=936 bgcolor=#E9E9E9
| 212936 ||  || — || October 26, 2008 || Mount Lemmon || Mount Lemmon Survey || — || align=right | 2.1 km || 
|-id=937 bgcolor=#d6d6d6
| 212937 ||  || — || October 28, 2008 || Kitt Peak || Spacewatch || — || align=right | 4.5 km || 
|-id=938 bgcolor=#E9E9E9
| 212938 ||  || — || October 31, 2008 || Mount Lemmon || Mount Lemmon Survey || — || align=right | 1.5 km || 
|-id=939 bgcolor=#fefefe
| 212939 ||  || — || November 23, 2008 || Mount Lemmon || Mount Lemmon Survey || — || align=right | 1.3 km || 
|-id=940 bgcolor=#E9E9E9
| 212940 ||  || — || December 21, 2008 || Mount Lemmon || Mount Lemmon Survey || — || align=right | 1.9 km || 
|-id=941 bgcolor=#fefefe
| 212941 ||  || — || December 21, 2008 || Mount Lemmon || Mount Lemmon Survey || MAS || align=right | 1.0 km || 
|-id=942 bgcolor=#fefefe
| 212942 ||  || — || December 30, 2008 || RAS || A. Lowe || — || align=right | 1.1 km || 
|-id=943 bgcolor=#E9E9E9
| 212943 ||  || — || December 29, 2008 || Mount Lemmon || Mount Lemmon Survey || — || align=right | 1.9 km || 
|-id=944 bgcolor=#E9E9E9
| 212944 ||  || — || December 29, 2008 || Mount Lemmon || Mount Lemmon Survey || — || align=right | 3.8 km || 
|-id=945 bgcolor=#d6d6d6
| 212945 ||  || — || December 30, 2008 || Mount Lemmon || Mount Lemmon Survey || — || align=right | 3.5 km || 
|-id=946 bgcolor=#d6d6d6
| 212946 ||  || — || December 30, 2008 || Kitt Peak || Spacewatch || THM || align=right | 2.7 km || 
|-id=947 bgcolor=#E9E9E9
| 212947 ||  || — || January 3, 2009 || Kitt Peak || Spacewatch || — || align=right | 2.9 km || 
|-id=948 bgcolor=#d6d6d6
| 212948 ||  || — || January 17, 2009 || Socorro || LINEAR || — || align=right | 2.9 km || 
|-id=949 bgcolor=#fefefe
| 212949 ||  || — || January 17, 2009 || Kitt Peak || Spacewatch || — || align=right | 1.2 km || 
|-id=950 bgcolor=#E9E9E9
| 212950 ||  || — || January 17, 2009 || Kitt Peak || Spacewatch || EUN || align=right | 1.4 km || 
|-id=951 bgcolor=#E9E9E9
| 212951 ||  || — || January 16, 2009 || Kitt Peak || Spacewatch || — || align=right | 2.2 km || 
|-id=952 bgcolor=#E9E9E9
| 212952 ||  || — || January 16, 2009 || Kitt Peak || Spacewatch || — || align=right | 3.6 km || 
|-id=953 bgcolor=#d6d6d6
| 212953 ||  || — || January 16, 2009 || Kitt Peak || Spacewatch || — || align=right | 4.5 km || 
|-id=954 bgcolor=#fefefe
| 212954 ||  || — || January 16, 2009 || Kitt Peak || Spacewatch || — || align=right | 1.3 km || 
|-id=955 bgcolor=#E9E9E9
| 212955 ||  || — || January 16, 2009 || Kitt Peak || Spacewatch || — || align=right | 1.4 km || 
|-id=956 bgcolor=#fefefe
| 212956 ||  || — || January 16, 2009 || Kitt Peak || Spacewatch || NYS || align=right data-sort-value="0.92" | 920 m || 
|-id=957 bgcolor=#fefefe
| 212957 ||  || — || January 20, 2009 || Kitt Peak || Spacewatch || — || align=right | 1.2 km || 
|-id=958 bgcolor=#d6d6d6
| 212958 ||  || — || January 18, 2009 || Mount Lemmon || Mount Lemmon Survey || THM || align=right | 3.0 km || 
|-id=959 bgcolor=#E9E9E9
| 212959 ||  || — || January 20, 2009 || Kitt Peak || Spacewatch || — || align=right | 1.8 km || 
|-id=960 bgcolor=#d6d6d6
| 212960 ||  || — || January 20, 2009 || Kitt Peak || Spacewatch || — || align=right | 2.8 km || 
|-id=961 bgcolor=#E9E9E9
| 212961 ||  || — || January 20, 2009 || Kitt Peak || Spacewatch || AST || align=right | 3.5 km || 
|-id=962 bgcolor=#fefefe
| 212962 ||  || — || January 29, 2009 || Dauban || Chante-Perdrix Obs. || — || align=right data-sort-value="0.88" | 880 m || 
|-id=963 bgcolor=#d6d6d6
| 212963 ||  || — || January 29, 2009 || Dauban || Chante-Perdrix Obs. || — || align=right | 3.9 km || 
|-id=964 bgcolor=#E9E9E9
| 212964 ||  || — || January 25, 2009 || Kitt Peak || Spacewatch || MIS || align=right | 2.9 km || 
|-id=965 bgcolor=#d6d6d6
| 212965 ||  || — || January 25, 2009 || Kitt Peak || Spacewatch || — || align=right | 3.2 km || 
|-id=966 bgcolor=#E9E9E9
| 212966 ||  || — || January 29, 2009 || Mount Lemmon || Mount Lemmon Survey || — || align=right | 2.7 km || 
|-id=967 bgcolor=#d6d6d6
| 212967 ||  || — || January 29, 2009 || Catalina || CSS || — || align=right | 4.9 km || 
|-id=968 bgcolor=#fefefe
| 212968 ||  || — || January 25, 2009 || Kitt Peak || Spacewatch || NYS || align=right data-sort-value="0.96" | 960 m || 
|-id=969 bgcolor=#fefefe
| 212969 ||  || — || January 29, 2009 || Kitt Peak || Spacewatch || MAS || align=right | 1.1 km || 
|-id=970 bgcolor=#fefefe
| 212970 ||  || — || January 30, 2009 || Mount Lemmon || Mount Lemmon Survey || FLO || align=right data-sort-value="0.76" | 760 m || 
|-id=971 bgcolor=#E9E9E9
| 212971 ||  || — || January 31, 2009 || Kitt Peak || Spacewatch || — || align=right | 2.3 km || 
|-id=972 bgcolor=#d6d6d6
| 212972 ||  || — || January 31, 2009 || Kitt Peak || Spacewatch || HYG || align=right | 3.2 km || 
|-id=973 bgcolor=#fefefe
| 212973 ||  || — || January 30, 2009 || Mount Lemmon || Mount Lemmon Survey || NYS || align=right data-sort-value="0.64" | 640 m || 
|-id=974 bgcolor=#E9E9E9
| 212974 ||  || — || January 31, 2009 || Kitt Peak || Spacewatch || — || align=right | 3.6 km || 
|-id=975 bgcolor=#fefefe
| 212975 ||  || — || January 31, 2009 || Kitt Peak || Spacewatch || V || align=right data-sort-value="0.72" | 720 m || 
|-id=976 bgcolor=#fefefe
| 212976 ||  || — || January 24, 2009 || Cerro Burek || Alianza S4 Obs. || FLO || align=right data-sort-value="0.75" | 750 m || 
|-id=977 bgcolor=#fefefe
| 212977 Birutė ||  ||  || February 2, 2009 || Moletai || K. Černis || FLO || align=right | 1.5 km || 
|-id=978 bgcolor=#d6d6d6
| 212978 ||  || — || February 1, 2009 || Kitt Peak || Spacewatch || — || align=right | 3.2 km || 
|-id=979 bgcolor=#E9E9E9
| 212979 ||  || — || February 2, 2009 || Kitt Peak || Spacewatch || AGN || align=right | 1.2 km || 
|-id=980 bgcolor=#E9E9E9
| 212980 ||  || — || February 14, 2009 || Bisei SG Center || BATTeRS || — || align=right | 2.9 km || 
|-id=981 bgcolor=#fefefe
| 212981 Majalitović ||  ||  || February 14, 2009 || OAM || OAM Obs. || — || align=right data-sort-value="0.74" | 740 m || 
|-id=982 bgcolor=#fefefe
| 212982 ||  || — || February 14, 2009 || Mount Lemmon || Mount Lemmon Survey || MAS || align=right data-sort-value="0.91" | 910 m || 
|-id=983 bgcolor=#fefefe
| 212983 ||  || — || February 14, 2009 || Mount Lemmon || Mount Lemmon Survey || — || align=right data-sort-value="0.76" | 760 m || 
|-id=984 bgcolor=#E9E9E9
| 212984 || 2009 DC || — || February 17, 2009 || RAS || A. Lowe || — || align=right | 1.9 km || 
|-id=985 bgcolor=#d6d6d6
| 212985 ||  || — || February 16, 2009 || Kitt Peak || Spacewatch || EOS || align=right | 3.7 km || 
|-id=986 bgcolor=#fefefe
| 212986 ||  || — || February 19, 2009 || Catalina || CSS || NYS || align=right | 1.1 km || 
|-id=987 bgcolor=#d6d6d6
| 212987 ||  || — || February 17, 2009 || OAM || OAM Obs. || — || align=right | 2.8 km || 
|-id=988 bgcolor=#d6d6d6
| 212988 ||  || — || February 19, 2009 || Kitt Peak || Spacewatch || CHA || align=right | 2.4 km || 
|-id=989 bgcolor=#fefefe
| 212989 ||  || — || February 19, 2009 || Kitt Peak || Spacewatch || — || align=right | 1.2 km || 
|-id=990 bgcolor=#d6d6d6
| 212990 ||  || — || February 21, 2009 || Kitt Peak || Spacewatch || KOR || align=right | 2.2 km || 
|-id=991 bgcolor=#fefefe
| 212991 Garcíalorca ||  ||  || February 23, 2009 || Calar Alto || F. Hormuth || — || align=right | 1.2 km || 
|-id=992 bgcolor=#E9E9E9
| 212992 ||  || — || February 22, 2009 || Kitt Peak || Spacewatch || — || align=right | 2.3 km || 
|-id=993 bgcolor=#E9E9E9
| 212993 || 2132 P-L || — || September 24, 1960 || Palomar || PLS || — || align=right | 4.8 km || 
|-id=994 bgcolor=#E9E9E9
| 212994 || 6598 P-L || — || September 24, 1960 || Palomar || PLS || — || align=right | 3.7 km || 
|-id=995 bgcolor=#fefefe
| 212995 || 1230 T-2 || — || September 29, 1973 || Palomar || PLS || — || align=right data-sort-value="0.97" | 970 m || 
|-id=996 bgcolor=#fefefe
| 212996 || 3226 T-2 || — || September 30, 1973 || Palomar || PLS || NYS || align=right | 1.0 km || 
|-id=997 bgcolor=#d6d6d6
| 212997 || 3238 T-2 || — || September 30, 1973 || Palomar || PLS || — || align=right | 6.2 km || 
|-id=998 bgcolor=#fefefe
| 212998 Tolbachik || 3931 T-3 ||  || October 16, 1977 || Palomar || PLS || H || align=right data-sort-value="0.99" | 990 m || 
|-id=999 bgcolor=#d6d6d6
| 212999 || 4330 T-3 || — || October 16, 1977 || Palomar || PLS || HYG || align=right | 4.4 km || 
|-id=000 bgcolor=#d6d6d6
| 213000 ||  || — || March 2, 1981 || Siding Spring || S. J. Bus || LIX || align=right | 5.0 km || 
|}

References

External links 
 Discovery Circumstances: Numbered Minor Planets (210001)–(215000) (IAU Minor Planet Center)

0212